= Squish (software) =

Commercial computer program to test graphical user interfaces

Squish GUI Tester
- Developer: Qt Group
- Release: 18 November 2003
- Stable release: 9.1 / 11 August 2025; 14 months ago
- Operating system: Windows, Unix-like, Linux, OS X, iOS, Android, Windows CE and QNX
- Size: 220 MB
- Available in: English
- Type: Graphical user interface testing
- License: Trialware
- Website: www.qt.io/product/quality-assurance/squish

Squish, is a commercial cross-platform GUI and regression testing tool that can test applications based on a variety of graphical user interface (GUI) technologies (see list below), across desktop, mobile, web and embedded platforms. Tests are typically scripted in languages such as Python, JavaScript, Ruby or Perl and can be executed across different operating systems without modification.

Distinctive features of Squish include object-based recognition, wide cross-platform support as well as capabilities for behavior-driven development (BDD).

Squish was initially developed by Froglogic in 2003. On April 13, 2021, the Qt Group acquired froglogic GmbH. Since then, Squish and the other froglogic products (Testcenter and CoCo) have been further developed and distributed by the Qt Group's Quality Assurance business unit.

== Overview ==
Squish was developed by Froglogic, but has since 2021 been maintained and further developed by Qt Group. Version 1.0 was released on 18 November 2003. Squish uses property-based object identification (independent of screen position), and is able to record and replay test scripts written in JavaScript, Perl, Python, Ruby or Tcl. It is a two-component system, consisting of a runner, which interprets and executes scripts, and a server, which hooks in and controls the application under test (AUT) by injecting a module into it that provides a TCP/IP connection between the AUT and the program running the test. Both components work on Windows, Linux, several Unix variants, Mac OS X, iOS, Android, Windows CE and QNX and other RTOSes.

As of version 6.0, the Squish GUI Tester fully integrates support for behavior-driven development (BDD) and testing extended by special functionality to apply this to GUI tests. Squish is compatible with the Gherkin (domain-specific language) used in tools such as Cucumber.

In version 9.1. the Squish AI Assistant was introduced, an IDE extension using large language models (LLMs) to help with test management.

Squish is shipped with the full source code.

In May 2012, Squish won Dr. Dobb's Jolt Productivity Award.

== Supported GUI technologies ==
According to Froglogic, Squish supports the following platforms:

- Qt, QML, QtQuick
- Java SWT/Eclipse RCP
- Java AWT/Swing
- JavaFX
- Windows MFC, .NET Windows Forms and WPF
- Mac OS X Carbon/Cocoa
- iOS Cocoa Touch
- Web/HTML/AJAX
- Flex
- Android
- XView
- Tk

== See also ==
- List of GUI testing tools
