= CRP =

CRP may refer to:

== Science and technology ==
- C-reactive protein, an acute phase protein produced by the liver
- cAMP receptor protein (catabolite gene activator protein)
- Cysteine-rich protein, a class of small proteins
- Carbon-fiber-reinforced polymers
- Chinese restaurant process, in probability theory
- Chronic relapsing polyneuropathy, an acquired disorder of the nervous system
- Confluent and reticulated papillomatosis, a skin condition
- Conducting redox polymer, an organic polymer that combines the properties of conducting polymers and redox active polymers

=== Computing ===
- Common reuse principle, in software design
- Conference room pilot, in software validation

== Organizations ==
- Calgary Regional Partnership, for planning, Alberta, Canada
- Center for Responsive Politics, a research group based in Washington, D.C., US, now part of OpenSecrets
- Chicana Rights Project, to protect Mexican-American women's rights
- Committee for the Re-Election of the President, for US president Richard Nixon
- CRP-Bangladesh, Centre for the Rehabilitation of the Paralysed
- Critical Role Productions, a multimedia production company based in California, US

== Transport ==
- Aerotransportes Corporativos (Aerotranscorp, ICAO code), Mexico; see Airline codes-A
- Central Railroad of Pennsylvania (reporting mark), US
- Community rail partnership, a form of community group in Great Britain
- Contra-rotating propellers, with a common axis
- Counter-rotating propellers, with separate axes
- Corpus Christi International Airport (IATA code), Texas, US

== Other uses ==
- Chestnut Ridge people, a mixed-race community of Barbour County, West Virginia, US
- Cape Roberts Project, a 1997–1999 geological drilling project in Antarctica
- Conservation Reserve Program, of US Department of Agriculture
- Cost per rating point, of an advertising campaign
- crp, an ISO 639-2 code for two collections of languages:
  - Creole language
  - Pidgin
