= Capybara (disambiguation) =

The capybara is a giant cavy rodent native to South America.

Capybara may also refer to:

- Capybara (software), a web-based test automation software
- Capybara Games, a Canadian independent game studio
- "Capybara" (Sons of Anarchy), a 2008 television episode
- "Capybara" (song), by Shonen Knife from Free Time
- Lesser capybara, a large semi-aquatic rodent closely related to the capybara
