= Sri Lanka Software Testing Board =

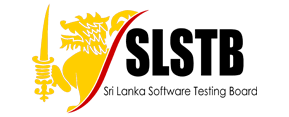
- Abbreviation: SLSTB
- Formation: August 2009
- Type: Nonprofit Organisation
- Purpose: Member Board of the ISTQB
- Headquarters: Colombo, Sri Lanka
- Region served: Sri Lanka
- Official language: English
- President: Sisira Kumara
- Vice President: Hussain Shabbir
- Director: Inthiquab Haddard
- Director: Chinthaka Idikadahena
- Main organ: Assembly
- Parent organization: International Software Testing Qualifications Board (ISTQB)
- Website: http://www.sl-stb.org/

The Sri Lanka Software Testing Board (SLSTB) is a software testing qualifications board that represents Sri Lankan interests internationally as the national board for Sri Lanka within the International Software Testing Qualifications Board (ISTQB) and promotes the broad profession of software testing.

== History ==
The SLSTB was formed in August, 2009 and was approved by the ISTQB General Assembly in October, 2009. The Board consists of testing experts from a wide range of organizations: the IT industry, consultancies, training providers and other professional and scientific/academic communities who volunteer their time to achieve the organization's goals of nurturing, promoting and supporting the software testing profession in Sri Lanka and help fellow software testing professionals to earn globally accepted qualifications.

== Activities ==
As a member of the ISTQB, SLSTB provides the leadership and regulates the accreditation process and certification regulations for the Sri Lankan software industry, through promoting the development of a common body of understanding and knowledge about testing in alignment with professional Software Quality Assurance international qualification ISTQB Certified Tester. The certification is based on rigorous, internationally developed syllabi, with a hierarchy of qualifications and guidelines for accreditation and examination to enable individuals and organizations to achieve the highest levels of proficiency in software quality.

== See also ==
- International Software Testing Qualifications Board
