= GWT =

GWT may refer to:

- G-TELP Writing Test, English language test
- Gawar-Bati language
- Given-When-Then
- Global workspace theory, a scientific theory of consciousness
- God's Word Translation, an English Bible translation
- Google Web Toolkit, or GWT Web Toolkit
- Great Western Trail, in North America
- Great Western Trains, now Great Western Railway
- Gross Weight Tonnage, a nautical measurement
- Guided wave testing
- Gwent Wildlife Trust, in Wales
- Sylt Airport, in Germany, by its IATA Code
- The Gurkha Welfare Trust, a British charity
