= Credential stuffing =

Cyberattack using mass login requests

Credential stuffing is a type of cyberattack in which the attacker collects stolen account credentials, typically consisting of lists of usernames or email addresses and the corresponding passwords (often from a data breach), and then uses the credentials to gain unauthorized access to user accounts on other systems through large-scale automated login requests directed against a web application. Unlike credential cracking, credential stuffing attacks do not attempt to use brute force or guess any passwords – the attacker simply automates the logins for a large number (thousands to millions) of previously discovered credential pairs using standard web automation tools such as Selenium, cURL, PhantomJS or tools designed specifically for these types of attacks, such as Sentry MBA, SNIPR, STORM, Blackbullet and Openbullet.

Credential stuffing attacks are possible because many users reuse the same username/password combination across multiple sites, with one survey reporting that 81% of users have reused a password across two or more sites and 25% of users use the same passwords across a majority of their accounts. In 2017, the FTC issued an advisory suggesting specific actions companies needed to take against credential stuffing, such as insisting on secure passwords and guarding against attacks. According to former Google click fraud czar Shuman Ghosemajumder, credential stuffing attacks have up to a 2% login success rate, meaning that one million stolen credentials can take over 20,000 accounts. Wired magazine described that the best way to protect against credential stuffing is to use unique passwords on accounts (such as those generated automatically by a password manager), enable two-factor authentication, and to have companies detect and stop credential stuffing attacks.

== Credential spills ==
A credential spill, alternatively referred to as a data breach or leak, arises when unauthorized individuals or groups illicitly obtain access to sensitive user credentials that organizations store. Such credentials frequently comprise usernames, email addresses, and passwords. The repercussions of credential spills can be significant, as they commonly subject users to a range of hazards, including identity theft, financial fraud, and unauthorized account infiltration.

Credential stuffing attacks are considered among the top security threats for web and mobile applications as a result of the volume of credential spills. More than three billion credentials were spilled through online data breaches in 2016 alone.

== Origin ==
The term was coined by Sumit Agarwal, co-founder of Shape Security, who was serving as Deputy Assistant Secretary of Defense at the Pentagon at the time.

== Incidents ==
On 20 August 2018, U.K. health and beauty retailer Superdrug was targeted with an attempted blackmail, with hackers showing purported evidence that they had penetrated the company's site and downloaded 20,000 users' records. The evidence was most likely obtained from hacks and spillages and then used as the source for credential stuffing attacks to glean information to create the bogus evidence.

In October and November 2016, attackers gained access to a private GitHub repository used by Uber (Uber BV and Uber UK) developers, using employees' usernames and passwords that had been compromised in previous breaches. The hackers claimed to have hijacked 12 employees' user accounts using the credential-stuffing method, as email addresses and passwords had been reused on other platforms. Multi-factor authentication, though available, was not activated for the affected accounts. The hackers located credentials for the company's AWS datastore in the repository files, which they used to obtain access to the records of 32 million non-US users and 3.7 million non-US drivers, as well as other data contained in over 100 S3 buckets. The attackers alerted Uber, demanding payment of $100,000 to agree to delete the data. The company paid through a bug bounty program but did not disclose the incident to affected parties for more than a year. After the breach came to light, the company was fined £385,000 (reduced to £308,000) by the U.K. Information Commissioner's Office.

In 2019, cybersecurity research firm Knight Lion Security claimed in a report that credential stuffing was a favored attack method for GnosticPlayers.

== Compromised credential checking ==
Compromised credential checking is a technique enabling users to be notified when passwords are breached by websites, web browsers or password extensions.

In February 2018, British computer scientist Junade Ali created a communication protocol (using k-anonymity and cryptographic hashing) to anonymously verify whether a password was leaked without fully disclosing the searched password. This protocol was implemented as a public API and is now consumed by multiple websites and services, including password managers and browser extensions. This approach was later replicated by Google's Password Checkup feature. Ali worked with academics at Cornell University to develop new versions of the protocol known as Frequency Smoothing Bucketization (FSB) and Identifier-Based Bucketization (IDB). In March 2020, cryptographic padding was added to the protocol.

=== Compromised credential checking implementations ===
Protocol	Developers	Made Public	References
k-Anonymity	Junade Ali (Cloudflare), Troy Hunt (Have I Been Pwned?)	21 February 2018	
Frequency Smoothing Bucketization & Identifier Based Bucketization	Cornell University (Lucy Li, Bijeeta Pal, Rahul Chatterjee, Thomas Ristenpart), Cloudflare (Junade Ali, Nick Sullivan)	May 2019	
Google Password Checkup (GPC)	Google, Stanford University	August 2019	
Active Credential Stuffing Detection	University of North Carolina at Chapel Hill (Ke Coby Wang, Michael K. Reiter)	December 2019	

== Legal action ==
=== 23andMe ===
In October 2023, 23andMe disclosed that attackers had gained unauthorized access to user accounts through a credential stuffing attack that exploited reused passwords from prior breaches on other platforms. The incident exposed profile data of approximately 6.9 million users, including information on genetic heritage, family connections, and in some cases health-related details.

The company later faced multiple class-action lawsuits in the United States, culminating in a proposed US$30 million settlement in 2024. In addition, the UK Information Commissioner’s Office (ICO) fined 23andMe £2.31 million for failing to adequately protect personal data of around 155,000 UK customers.

=== Dunkin' Donuts ===
In September 2020, Dunkin' Brands Group, Inc. reached a settlement with the New York Attorney General over credential stuffing attacks that had compromised tens of thousands of customer DD Perks loyalty accounts between 2015 and 2018. Attackers used reused credentials from other breaches to gain unauthorized access, which in some cases allowed fraudulent use of stored value cards.

Under the terms of the settlement, Dunkin' was required to notify impacted customers, reset affected passwords, provide refunds for unauthorized transactions, and enhance its information security program. The company also agreed to pay $650,000 USD in penalties and costs to New York (state), without admitting wrongdoing.

== See also ==
- Data breach
