= Playwright (software) =

End-to-end testing framework

- Developer: Microsoft
- Release: January 31, 2020; 6 years ago
- Stable release: 1.65.1 / 13 November 2026; 3 days ago
- Written in: TypeScript
- Operating system: Microsoft Windows, macOS, Linux
- Type: Software testing framework for web applications
- License: Apache License 2.0
- Website: playwright.dev
- Repository: github.com/microsoft/playwright

Playwright is an open-source automation library for browser testing and web scraping developed by Microsoft and launched on 31 January 2020, which has since become popular among programmers and web developers.

Playwright provides the ability to automate browser tasks in Chromium, Firefox, and WebKit with a single API. It can also operate against branded browsers such as Google Chrome and Microsoft Edge available on the host machine, although these browsers are not installed by default. The current Playwright version supports Stable, Beta, Dev, and Canary channels of Google Chrome and Microsoft Edge. This allows developers to create reliable end-to-end tests that are capable of running in non-headless mode, as well as in headless mode for automation.

Playwright supports programming languages like JavaScript, Python, C# and Java, though its main API was originally written in Node.js. It supports all modern web features including network interception and multiple browser contexts and provides automatic waiting, which reduces the flakiness of tests.

== @playwright/test ==
@playwright/test is a test runner with Jest-like assertions developed and maintained by the Playwright team that is built on top of the Playwright API. This test runner is tightly integrated with Playwright and is specifically designed for end-to-end testing. It has capabilities like browser-specific tests, parallel test execution, rich browser context options, snapshot testing, automatic retries and many more.

== History ==
Playwright was announced by Microsoft in January 2020. It was developed to address the need for a unified API for cross-browser testing and to overcome limitations in existing tools like Puppeteer, Cypress and Selenium. A team of engineers, including those who had previously worked on Puppeteer at Google, contributed to its development. Playwright introduced features like automatic waits, multi-browser support, and network interception, making it a powerful tool for modern web testing. Since its inception, it has been actively maintained and has seen rapid growth and adoption in the web testing community.

The @playwright/test runner was released later as part of an effort to provide a more comprehensive solution for browser-based testing. Its development was largely based on the need to have a specialized runner that can leverage the full potential of the Playwright API and make end-to-end testing more robust and straightforward.

== Usage and examples ==
Playwright is primarily used for automating browser tasks, which can range from simple page navigation and content scraping to more complex operations like automated form submissions, user interactions and more. For instance, a simple JavaScript code snippet using Playwright might look like:

const { chromium } = require('playwright');

(async () => {
  const browser = await chromium.launch();
  const page = await browser.newPage();
  await page.goto('https://example.com');
  await page.screenshot({ path: 'example.png' });
  await browser.close();
})();

In this example, Playwright is used to open a Chromium browser, navigate to https://example.com, take a screenshot and save it as example.png.

@playwright/test further extends these capabilities by providing a test runner that allows developers to write and organize their tests in a more structured and scalable manner. An example test using @playwright/test might look like:

const { test } = require('@playwright/test');

test('basic test', async ({ page }) => {
  await page.goto('https://example.com');
  await expect(page).toHaveTitle('Example Domain');
});

In this example, a test is written to navigate to https://example.com and check that the title of the page is "Example Domain".

=== Configuration ===
Playwright tests can be customized using a configuration file (playwright.config.js) that supports various options including:

- Test timeout settings
- Retry attempts for failed tests
- Screenshot and video capture settings
- Headless mode configuration
- Test parallelization options

An example configuration might look like:

module.exports = {
  testDir: './tests',
  timeout: 30000,
  retries: 2,
  use: {
    headless: true,
    screenshot: 'only-on-failure',
    video: 'retain-on-failure',
  },
};

=== Debugging features ===
Playwright includes built-in debugging capabilities such as:

- Screenshots captured on test failures
- Video recording of test runs
- Trace viewer for detailed step-by-step analysis
- Debug mode with browser inspector
- Console logs and network request monitoring

=== Reporters ===
Reporters in Playwright define how test results are captured, aggregated, and surfaced after execution. They turn raw test events into structured output such as logs, files, dashboards, or external integrations, enabling teams to analyze trends, spot regressions, and debug failures more effectively.

By centralizing errors, timings, traces, screenshots, and metadata, reporters make it easier to understand why tests failed, not just that they failed.

Playwright includes built-in reporters and exposes a reporter API that supports both open-source and commercial implementations, which are listed below.

- Monocart Reporter
- Currents
- ReportPortal
- Allure Report
- Endform

=== Usage Trends ===
As of 2025, Playwright is reported to have over 75,000 GitHub stars, more than 20 million NPM all‑time downloads, and over 11,000 Stack Overflow questions. It has been described as experiencing the fastest growth in community adoption, GitHub stars, and modern usage among major web testing frameworks.

Data Insights (Playwright 2025)
Tool	GitHub Stars	NPM All Time Downloads	StackOverflow Questions	First Released
Playwright	75,000+	20M+	11,000+	2020
