= Behat (software) =

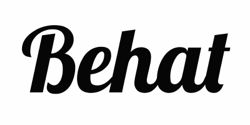
- Developer: Konstantin Kudryashov
- Release: 8 September 2010; 15 years ago
- Stable release: 3.32.0 / 20 June 2026; 1 day ago
- Written in: PHP
- Operating system: Cross-platform
- Type: Behavior-driven development
- License: MIT License
- Website: behat.org
- Repository: github.com/Behat/Behat

Behat is a test framework for behavior-driven development written in the PHP programming language. Behat was created by Konstantin Kudryashov and its development is hosted on GitHub.

== Purpose ==
Behat is intended to aid communication between developers, clients and other stakeholders during a software development process. It allows the clear documentation of testable examples of the software's intended behaviour. Behat test scenarios are written with Gherkin, a business-readable domain-specific language following defined patterns.

== Benefits ==
Tests can be run at any point new code is introduced into a codebase to confirm no regressions within the existing test coverage are introduced. It can be used to directly test php code and is often used with Selenium to remote control browsers as part of the scenarios. The browsers under remote control can take videos or screenshots of failures. Using selenium or tools like selenoid a "grid" of browsers can be remote controlled for parallel test execution. There is also a module for running php only scenarios.

Like other BDD frameworks, Behat scenarios are a series of Given, When, and Then steps that explain a business case. The definition of these steps exist within method annotations of a class that extends the BehatContext.

Behat can output test results in a number of different formats, including JUnit XML and HTML

== Examples ==
The preconditions after "Given" correspond to the PHP method name to execute:

Feature: Simple description of this feature’s story

  Describe benefit, role and feature or user story
  Use as many lines as needed

  Background:
    Given some step run for all scenarios
    
  Scenario: Scenario or example description
    Given I setup preconditions with:
      | data column 1 | data column 2 |
      | alice         | bob           |
    When I press the "blue" button
    Then the result is:
    """
    A multiple line
    string of data
    """

    #comments can be added as needed

  Scenario Outline: Scenario or example description using setting <setting>
    Given I setup config with "<setting>"
    When I push button "<button>"
    Then "<result>" happens
    Examples:
      | setting | button | result           |
      | a       | red    | there is a beep  |
      | b       | blue   | there is no beep |
