= Software testing certification board =

A software testing certification board is an entity that provides professional certification for software testing and software quality assurance.

== Notable boards ==
=== British Computer Society ===
The British Computer Society (BCS) is a British learned society that offers software testing certification. Since 2012, its professional software testing certification has been the successor to Systems Analysis Examination Board (SAEB) and the Information Systems Examination Board (ISEB).

=== International Software Certification Board ===
The International Software Certification Board (ISCB) is an international software testing board, affiliated with the Quality Assurance Institute (QAI). The ISCB was founded in 1980. Since 1985, it has offered the Certified Software Quality Analyst (CSQA) certification, originally called Certified Quality Analyst (CQA).

=== International Software Testing Qualifications Board ===
The International Software Testing Qualifications Board (ISTQB) is an international software testing board, founded in 2002.

The ISTQB has 66 member boards, including the American Software Testing Qualifications Board (ASTQB), the Australia and New Zealand Testing Board (ANZTB), the Czech and Slovak Testing Board (CaSTB), and the Sri Lanka Software Testing Board (SLSTB).
