= DotNetBrowser =

- Developer(s): TeamDev
- Initial release: 6 April 2015; 10 years ago
- Stable release: 2.27.1 / 30 May 2024
- Written in: C#, C++
- Operating system: Microsoft Windows, Linux, macOS
- Type: Framework, Web browser
- License: Proprietary
- Website: https://teamdev.com/dotnetbrowser

DotNetBrowser is a proprietary .NET library that provides a Chromium-based engine which can be used to load and display web pages. It is developed and supported by TeamDev since 2015.

== Features ==
Some main features are as follows:

- Load and display the web page.
- Embed a Chromium-based browser in a .NET desktop application as an Avalonia UI, WPF or Windows Forms control.
- Handle navigation and network events.
- Access Document Object Model of the loaded web page.
- Execute JavaScript on the loaded web page, inject .NET objects and call them from JavaScript

== Usage ==
Primary usage is embedding a browser into various .NET desktop applications and displaying the web pages. DotNetBrowser can be used as a headless browser. The headless mode is also available on Linux and macOS.

Another known use-cases are creating web-based kiosk applications and VSTO add-ins for Microsoft Office.

More examples and use-cases are available in the DotNetBrowser Examples repository.

== Example ==
=== WPF ===
XAML markup

<Window x:Class="Sample.Wpf.MainWindow"
        xmlns="http://schemas.microsoft.com/winfx/2006/xaml/presentation"
        xmlns:x="http://schemas.microsoft.com/winfx/2006/xaml"
        xmlns:d="http://schemas.microsoft.com/expression/blend/2008"
        xmlns:mc="http://schemas.openxmlformats.org/markup-compatibility/2006"
        xmlns:wpf="clr-namespace:DotNetBrowser.Wpf;assembly=DotNetBrowser.Wpf"
        mc:Ignorable="d"
        Title="MainWindow" Height="450" Width="800" Closed="MainWindow_OnClosed">
    <Grid>
        <wpf:BrowserView x:Name="browserView"/>
    </Grid>
</Window>

C#

using System;
using System.Windows
using DotNetBrowser.Browser;
using DotNetBrowser.Engine;

namespace Sample.Wpf;

public partial class MainWindow : Window
{
    private readonly IEngine _engine;
    private readonly IBrowser _browser;
     
    public MainWindow()
    {
        InitializeComponent();
         
        // Create and initialize the IEngine
        _engine = EngineFactory.Create();
         
        // Create the IBrowser
        _browser = engine.CreateBrowser();
        _browser.Navigation.LoadUrl("https://teamdev.com/dotnetbrowser");
         
        // Initialize the WPF BrowserView control
        browserView.InitializeFrom(browser);
    }
     
    private void MainWindow_OnClosed(object sender, EventArgs e)
    {
        _browser.Dispose();
        _engine.Dispose();
    }
}

=== Windows Forms ===
C#

using System;
using System.Windows.Forms;
using DotNetBrowser.Browser;
using DotNetBrowser.Engine;
using DotNetBrowser.WinForms;

namespace Sample.WinForms;

public partial class Form1 : Form
{
    private readonly IEngine _engine;
    private readonly IBrowser _browser;
     
    public Form1()
    {
        InitializeComponent();
         
        // Create and initialize the IEngine
        _engine = EngineFactory.Create();
         
        // Create the Windows Forms BrowserView control
        var browserView = new BrowserView
        {
            Dock = DockStyle.Fill
        };
         
        // Create the IBrowser
        _browser = engine.CreateBrowser();
        _browser.Navigation.LoadUrl("https://teamdev.com/dotnetbrowser");
         
        // Initialize the Windows Forms BrowserView control
        browserView.InitializeFrom(browser);
         
        // Add the BrowserView control to the Form
        Controls.Add(browserView);
        Closed += Form1Closed;
    }
     
    private void Form1Closed(object sender, EventArgs e)
    {
        _browser.Dispose();
        _engine.Dispose();
    }
}

== See also ==
- Chromium Embedded Framework
- Electron
