= Mocha (JavaScript framework) =

JavaScript test framework running on Node.js

- Developer(s): OpenJS Foundation
- Initial release: November 22, 2011
- Stable release: 11.2.0 / 17 March 2025; 14 days ago
- Repository: github.com/mochajs/mocha
- Written in: JavaScript
- Platform: Node.js
- Type: Test automation framework
- License: MIT
- Website: mochajs.org

Mocha is a JavaScript test framework for Node.js programs, featuring browser support, asynchronous testing, test coverage reports, and use of any assertion library.

== Assertion libraries ==
Mocha can be used with most JavaScript assertion libraries, including:

- should.js
- express.js
- chai
- better-assert
- unexpected

== Usage and examples ==
$ npm install -g mocha
$ mkdir test
$ $EDITOR test/test.js # or open with your favorite editor

var assert = require("assert")
describe('Foo', function(){
  describe('#getBar(value)', function() {
    it('should return 100 when value is negative') // placeholder
    it('should return 0 when value is positive', function() {
      assert.equal(0, Foo.getBar(10));
    })
  })
})

$  mocha
.
1 test complete (1ms)

For asynchronous testing, invoke the callback, and Mocha will wait for completion.

describe('Foo', function(){
  describe('#bar()', function() {
    it('should work without error', function(done) {
      var foo = new Foo(128);
      foo.bar(done);
    })
  })
})

== See also ==
- Jasmine
- List of unit testing frameworks
- npm
- QUnit
- JavaScript framework
- JavaScript library
