= Conducting redox polymer =

Organic polymers that have properties of conducting and redox active polymers

Conducting redox polymers (CRPs) or intrinsically conducting redox polymers are organic polymers that combine the properties of conducting polymers and redox active polymers. They consist of a conducting polymer backbone with redox active pendant groups.

The conducting backbone is usually polythiophene or polypyrrole based. As pendant groups quinones, radicals (eg. TEMPO), and metal complexes (eg. ferrocene) have been used.

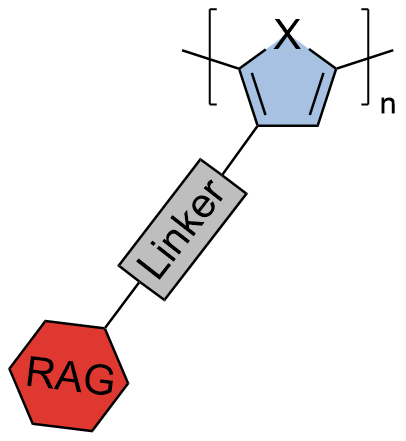
Schematics of a conducting redox polymer. RAG = redox active group; X = N or S.

The conducting polymer backbone makes the addition of conductive additives obsolete which is a major advantage for practical applications like energy storage compared to conventional redox active polymers.

== Synthesis ==
The general strategy for the synthesis of conducting redox polymers is to attach a redox active group to a monomer (or a trimer) of the respective conducting polymer. These monomers, which are often EDOT derivatives, are subsequently polymerised either by electropolymerization or by chemical oxidative polymerisation (eg. with FeCl_{3} or Fe(OTs)_{3}).

== Redox Potential Matching ==
When designing a conducting redox polymer it is important to consider the different redox-potentials of the pendant group and the polymer backbone, as the polymer backbone is only conductive in its doped state. If the polymer backbone loses its conductivity before the redox reaction of the pendant group is complete, the pendant group can get trapped in its charged state. In order to avoid charge trapping, the polymer backbone must be sufficiently conductive in the potential region in which the redox-reaction of the pendant group occurs, hence the doping onset potential has to be lower than the redox-potential of the oxidation, or higher than the redox-potential of the reduction. Conducting redox polymers in which this is fulfilled, are referred to as having a potential match between the polymer backbone and the pendant group.
