= Specification-driven development =

Software engineering methodology

Specification-driven development is a software development approach in which specifications are used to develop software. It mirrors the exact same steps Behavior-driven development uses, but resulting in different artifacts which are created with the assistance of AI agents.

Specification-driven development is a type of documentation-driven development, along with model-driven development, model transformation, and round-trip engineering.

Ostroff, Makalsky, and Paige present an agile approach to specification-driven development that combines features of test-driven development and the plan-based approach of design by contract. They describe tests and contracts as different types of specifications that are useful and complementary for developing software.

== See also ==
- Behavior-driven development
- Design by contract
- Formal methods
- Model-driven engineering
- Test-driven development
