= Conference room pilot =

In software validation

Conference room pilot (CRP) is a type of software procurement and software acceptance testing. A CRP may be used during the selection and implementation of a software application in an organization or company.

The purpose of the conference room pilot is to validate a software application against the business processes of end-users of the software, by allowing end-users to use the software to carry out typical or key business processes using the new software. A commercial advantage of a conference room pilot is that it may allow the customer to prove that the new software will do the job (meets business requirements and expectations) before committing to buying the software, thus avoiding buying an inappropriate application. The term is most commonly used in the context of 'out of the box' (OOTB) or 'commercial off-the-shelf' software (COTS).

== Compared to user acceptance testing ==
Although a conference room pilot shares some features of user acceptance testing (UAT), it should not be considered a testing process – it validates that a design or solution is fit for purpose at a higher level than functional testing.

Shared features of CRP and UAT include:

- End-to-end business processes are used as a "business input" for both
- Functionality demonstrations
- Non-functional validation(e.g. performance testing)

Differences between a conference room pilot and a formal UAT:

- It is attempting to identify how well the application meets business needs, and identify gaps, whilst still in the design phase of the project
- There is an expectation that changes will be required before acceptance of the solution
- The software is ‘on trial’ and may be rejected completely in favour of another solution.
