= Cypress (software) =

JavaScript testing framework

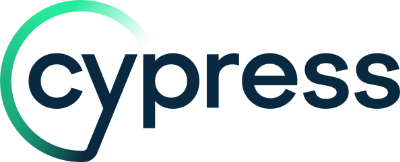
- Initial release: September 10, 2017; 8 years ago
- Stable release: 15.16.0 / 26 May 2026; 10 days ago
- Written in: JavaScript
- Operating system: Microsoft Windows, macOS, Linux
- Type: Software testing framework for web applications
- License: MIT
- Website: www.cypress.io
- Repository: github.com/cypress-io/cypress

Cypress is a frontend test automation tool (framework) for regression testing of web applications including End-to-End (E2E), integration, and unit tests. Cypress runs on Windows, Linux, and macOS. The Cypress app is open-source software released under the MIT License, while Cypress Cloud is a commercial software as a service web application with free and paid plans. Cypress has been compared to Selenium.

== See also ==
- Playwright (software)
- List of web testing tools
