= Framework for integrated test =

Open-source tool for automated customer tests

Framework for Integrated Test (Fit), is an open-source (GNU GPL v2) tool for automated customer tests. It integrates the work of customers, analysts, testers, and developers.

Customers provide examples of how their software should work. Those examples are then connected to the software with programmer-written test fixtures and automatically checked for correctness. The customers' examples are formatted in tables and saved as HTML using ordinary business tools such as Microsoft Excel. When Fit checks the document, it creates a copy and colors the tables green, red, and yellow according to whether the software behaved as expected.

Fit was invented by Ward Cunningham in 2002. He created the initial Java version of Fit. As of June 2005, it has up-to-date versions for Java, C#, Python, Perl, PHP and Smalltalk.

Although Fit is an acronym, the word "Fit" came first, making it a backronym. Fit is sometimes italicized but should not be capitalized. In other words, "Fit" and "Fit" are appropriate usage, but "FIT" is not.

Fit includes a simple command-line tool for checking Fit documents. There are third-party front-ends available. Of these, FitNesse is the most popular. FitNesse is a complete IDE for Fit that uses a Wiki for its front end. As of June 2005, FitNesse had forked Fit, making it incompatible with newer versions of Fit; however, plans were underway to re-merge with Fit.

== See also ==
- Concordion - a Java testing framework similar to Fit
