= Gauge (software) =

Cross-platform test automation tool

- Developer: ThoughtWorks
- Stable release: 1.6.35 / 23 July 2026; 20 days ago
- Written in: Go
- Operating system: cross-platform
- Type: Test automation tool
- License: Apache 2.0
- Website: gauge.org
- Repository: github.com/getgauge/gauge

Gauge is a lightweight cross-platform test automation tool. It uses markdown to author test cases and scenarios. Its modular architecture makes it flexible and scalable.

== Markdown ==
Gauge specifications are written in the business language. For example,

Find movies playing near me
===========================

The System Under Test in this example is a web application to find and book movie tickets

Search for movies
-----------------

* Specify location as "Bangalore"
* Search for movie "Star Wars"
* Verify that "INOX" is playing "Star Wars" at "7:30&nbsp;pm"

Book movie ticket
-----------------

* Sign up with email address <user@example.com>
* Complete the verification
* Select location as "Bangalore", the movie "Star Wars" and "3" seats
* Confirm and pay
* Verify the "e-ticket" has been sent to the registered email.

This Gauge specification describes a feature of the system under test. The scenarios Search for movies and Book movie ticket represent a flow in this specification. Steps are executable parts of a specification.

=== Test code ===
Specifications in Markdown abstracts code behind the steps.

For example, the step Specify location as "Bangalore" implementation in Java would look like

// This Method can be written in any java class as long as it is in classpath.

public class StepImplementation {
   @Step("Specify location as <location>")
   public void helloWorld(String location) {
       // Step implementation
   }
}

Gauge has Support for writing test code in:

- Java
- Ruby
- C#

The Community contributed language runners are:

- JavaScript
- Python
- Go

=== Execution ===
Gauge tests can be executed from the command line or the supported IDEs.

The default command gauge specs run the tests sequentially.

The command gauge -p specs will execute the tests in Parallel.

=== Reports ===
Gauge gives comprehensive test reports that provides the required details of a given run.

=== IDE support ===
Gauge's IDE support helps to write and maintain the test suite.
