= System under test =

System under test (SUT) refers to a system that is being tested for correct operation. According to ISTQB it is the test object.

From a unit testing perspective, the system under test represents all of the classes in a test that are not predefined pieces of code such as stubs or mocks. Each class under test can have its own configuration, such as a name and version, allowing test suites to scale as the system's complexity grows.

ISO/IEC/IEEE 29119 defines SUT within a standardized vocabulary and test-process framework.

== See also ==
- Device under test
- Test harness
