= Comparison of GUI testing tools =

GUI testing tools serve the purpose of automating the testing process of software with graphical user interfaces.

| Name | Supported platforms (testing system) | Supported platforms (tested system) | Developer | License | Latest version | Reference | Status |
|---|---|---|---|---|---|---|---|
| AutoHotkey | Windows | Windows | AutoHotkey | GNU GPL v2 | 2.0.21 | | Active |
| AutoIt | Windows | Windows | AutoIt | Proprietary | 3.3.14.5 | | Active |
| Appium | Windows, Linux, Mac (Python, C#, Ruby, Java, JavaScript, PHP, Robot Framework) | iOS, Android (both native App & browser hosted app) | JS Foundation | Apache | (Binding Specific) | | Active |
| Dojo Objective Harness | cross-platform | Web | Dojo Foundation | AFL | 6.0 | | Active |
| eggPlant Functional | Windows, Linux, OS X | Windows, Linux, OS X, iOS, Android, Blackberry, Win Embedded, Win CE | TestPlant Ltd | Proprietary | Unknown | | Active |
| HP WinRunner | Windows | Windows | Hewlett-Packard | Proprietary | Unknown | | Discontinued |
| iMacros | Web (cross-browser) | Unknown | iOpus | Proprietary | 12.5/10.0.5/10.0.2 | | |
| Linux Desktop Testing Project | Linux (With Windows and OSX ports) | GUI applications with accessibility APIs | (Collaborative project) | GNU LGPL | 3.5.0 | | |
| Oracle Application Testing Suite | Windows | Web, Oracle Technology Products | Oracle | Proprietary | 12.5 | | Active |
| Playwright | Web (cross-browser) | Web | (Collaborative project) | Apache | 1.53.0 | | Active |
| QF-Test | Windows, Linux, macOS X, Web (cross-browser) | Windows, Java/Swing/SWT/Eclipse, JavaFX, Web applications, Windows Applications, C++, Android | Quality First Software GmbH | Proprietary | 7.0.8 | | Active |
| Ranorex Studio | Windows | Windows, Web, iOS, Android | Ranorex GmbH | Proprietary | 9.3.4 | | Active |
| Robot Framework | Web (cross-browser) | Web | (Collaborative project) | Apache | 3.1.2 | | Active |
| Sahi | Web (cross-browser), Windows | Web, Java, Java Web Start, Applet, Flex | Tyto Software | Apache and Proprietary | 5.1 (open source, frozen), 10.0.0 | | Active |
| Selenium | Web (cross-browser) | Web | (Collaborative project) | Apache | 3.141.59 | | Active |
| SilkTest | Windows | Windows, Web | Micro Focus previously Borland and Segue | Proprietary | 20.0 | | Active |
| SOAtest | Windows, Linux, (cross-browser) | Web (cross-browser) | Parasoft | Proprietary | 9.10.8 | | Active |
| Squish GUI Tester | Windows, Linux, macOS, Solaris, AIX, QNX, WinCE, Windows Embedded, embedded Linux, Android, iOS | Qt, QML, QtQuick, Java AWT, Swing, SWT, RCP, JavaFx, Win32, MFC, WinForms, WPF, HTML5 (cross-browser), macOS Cocoa, iOS, Android, Tk | The Qt Company (froglogic GmbH) | Proprietary | 6.7 | | Active |
| Test Studio | Windows | Windows, Test Studio, Android, iOS | Telerik by Progress | Proprietary | R1 2022 | | Active |
| TestComplete | Windows | Windows, Android, iOS, Web | SmartBear Software | Proprietary | 14.10 | | Active |
| TestPartner | Windows | Windows | Micro Focus | Proprietary | 6.3.2 | | Discontinued |
| Twist | Unknown | Unknown | ThoughtWorks | Proprietary | 14.1.0 | | Discontinued |
| Unified Functional Testing (UFT) previously named HP QuickTest Professional (QTP) | Windows | Windows, Web, Mobile, Terminal Emulators, SAP, Siebel, Java, .NET, Flex, others... | Hewlett Packard Enterprise | Proprietary | 14.53 | | Active |
| Watir | Web | Web (cross-browser) | (Collaborative project) | BSD | 6.16.5 | | |
| Xnee | UNIX | X Window | GNU Project, Henrik Sandklef | GNU GPL | 3.19 | | |
