= Katalon Studio =

Automation testing software tool

Katalon Platform
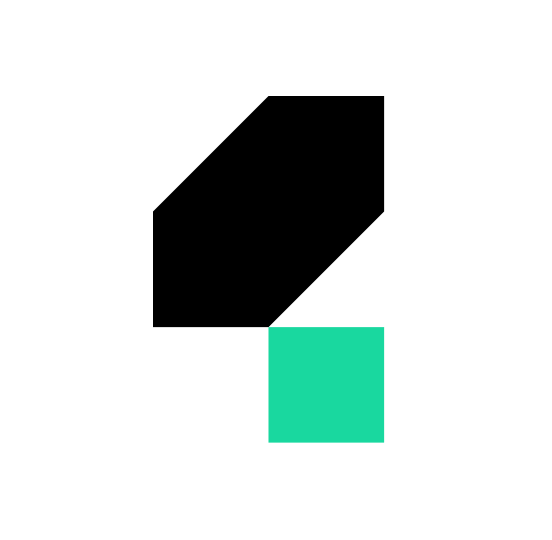
- Developers: Katalon, Inc.
- Initial release: January 2015
- Stable release: 10.x / 31 October 2024; 15 months ago
- Operating system: Microsoft Windows, macOS, Linux for authoring and agents. Execution also via cloud.
- Available in: English
- Type: Test automation
- License: Proprietary
- Website: https://katalon.com/

Katalon Platform is an automation testing software tool developed by Katalon, Inc. The software uses open-source automation frameworks Selenium, Appium and provides an IDE interface for web, API, mobile and desktop application testing. Its initial release for internal use was in January 2015. Its first public release was in September 2016.

== Platform Components ==
The Katalon Platform comprises modular features that can be used individually or together for test authoring, execution, and management.

=== Katalon Studio ===
Katalon Studio is the test authoring component for web, mobile, API, and Windows desktop applications. It provides a recorder for no-code/low-code test creation and a script view with code-completion and debugging features. The platform supports data-driven and keyword-driven testing, and follows the Page Object Model (POM) pattern. It uses open-source frameworks such as Selenium and Appium.

From version 10.x, Studio includes the StudioAssist feature, which allows users to generate, maintain, and refactor test scripts using natural-language prompts.

=== Test Execution ===
Katalon Runtime Engine (KRE) is a command-line and CI/CD execution engine for headless and parallel test runs, supporting Docker and scheduler use cases. Katalon TestCloud provides parallel test execution on hosted browsers and mobile devices in the cloud, enabling cross-browser and cross-device testing. The service also supports visual testing and mobile live testing.

=== Test Management & Analytics ===
Katalon TestOps provides a centralized platform for test management and analytics, connecting planning, execution, and reporting. It includes dashboards for quality metrics, flaky-test detection, and release readiness. TestOps integrates with CI/CD tools such as Jenkins, Azure DevOps, and GitHub Actions to support continuous testing and provide analytics.

=== Autonomous Testing ===
Launched in 2025, TrueTest is an AI-based feature described by the vendor as analyzing production user behavior to generate and maintain regression tests. It is intended to align testing with commonly used user journeys.

== Underlying technologies and integrations ==
Katalon tools build on open standards and integrate with common delivery stacks.

- Web automation is based on Selenium and the W3C WebDriver standard. Mobile automation uses Appium 2.x.
- Typical CI or CD integrations include Jenkins, Azure DevOps and GitHub Actions.
- Containerized or cloud execution commonly uses Docker or Kubernetes, or runs in TestCloud.

Remote execution in Katalon Platform can be triggered by CI systems via Docker container or command line interface (CLI).

== Technologies ==
The test automation framework provided within Katalon Platform was developed with the keyword-driven approach as the primary test authoring method with data-driven functionality for test execution.

The user interface is an integrated development environment (IDE) implemented on Eclipse rich client platform (RCP).

The keyword libraries are a composition of common actions for web, API, and mobile testings. External libraries written in Java can be imported into a project to be used as native functions.

The main programming language used in Katalon Platform are Groovy and Java. Katalon Platform supports cross-environment test executions. Supported technologies

- Modern web technologies: HTML, HTML5, JavaScript, Ajax, Angular
- Windows desktop apps platforms: Universal Windows Platform (UWP), Windows Forms (WinForms), Windows Presentation Foundation (WPF), and Classic Windows (Win32)
- Cross-browser testing: Firefox, Chrome, Microsoft Edge, Internet Explorer (9,10,11), Safari, headless browsers
- Mobile apps: Android and iOS (Native apps and mobile web apps)
- Web services: RESTful and SOAP

System requirements

Operating systems: Windows 7, Windows 8, Windows 10, macOS 10.11+, Linux (Ubuntu-based).

== License ==
Katalon Platform was initially released as freeware. In October 2019, with the release of version 7, the company introduced a new licensing model that included both free and proprietary options.

Katalon uses a freemium licensing model offering both free and paid tiers. The company offers a 30-day trial with access to all features. After the trial, the free tier includes test authoring and execution features via Katalon Studio. Other features, such as cloud-based execution (TestCloud), centralized analytics (TestOps), and AI-powered testing capabilities (TrueTest, StudioAssist), are available via paid subscriptions.

Licences are managed through the Katalon Platform Portal, where administrators assign seats, manage users, and monitor usage across the product suite.

== Integrations ==
Katalon Platform can be integrated with other software products, including:

- Software development life cycle (SDLC) management: Jira, TestRail, qTest, and TestLink
- CI/CD integration: Jenkins, Bamboo, TeamCity, CircleCI, Azure DevOps, and Travis CI
- Team collaboration: Git, Slack, and Microsoft Teams
- Execution platform support: Selenium, BrowserStack, SauceLabs, LambdaTest, and Kobiton
- Visual testing: Applitools

== Reception ==
In 2018, the software acquired 9% of market penetration for UI test automation, according to The State of Testing 2018 Report by SmartBear.

In March 2019 and March 2020, Gartner Peer Insights listed Katalon as a ‘Customers’ Choice’ for Software Test Automation

In 2025, Gartner positioned Katalon as a ‘Visionary’ in its Magic Quadrant for AI-Augmented Software Testing Tools.

== See also ==
- Selenium (software)
- Appium
- Test automation
- GUI software testing
- Comparison of GUI testing tools
- List of GUI testing tools
- List of web testing tools
