= QF-Test =

Software test automation tool

- Developer: Quality First Software
- Stable release: 11.1.0
- Operating system: Microsoft Windows, Linux, macOS
- Type: graphical user interface testing
- License: proprietary license
- Website: www.qftest.com

QF-Test from Quality First Software is a cross-platform software tool for automated testing of programs via the graphical user interface (GUI) test automation). The program is specialized on (Java/Swing, Standard Widget Toolkit (SWT), Eclipse plug-ins and rich client platform (RCP) applications, ULC and JavaFX) cross-web browser test automation of static and dynamic web applications (HTML and web frameworks like Angular, Ext JS, Fluent UI React, Google Web Toolkit (GWT), jQuery UI, jQueryEasyUI Remote Application Platform (RAP), Qooxdoo, RichFaces, Vaadin, React, Smart GWT, Vue.js, ICEfaces and ZK). Version 4.1 added support for macOS and the Apple Safari and Microsoft Edge browsers via the Selenium WebDriver. Representational State Transfer (RESTful) web service testing. From version 5.0, Windows applications can also be tested (classic Win32 applications, .NET framework applications (often developed in C#) based on Windows Presentation Foundation (WPF) or Windows Forms, Windows apps and Universal Windows Platform (UWP) applications using Extensible Application Markup Language (XAML) controls) and modern C++ applications (such as Qt applications). Version 5.3 added support for the Chrome DevTools protocol, which allows browsers to be controlled using CDP drivers. Since then, mobile testing for iOS and Android, accessibility testing of web applications and SmartID, a new approach for more flexible and robust component recognition, have been introduced. Powerful enhancements such as WebAPI testing and AI-assisted validation complement the test automation tool. QF-Test 10.0 introduced AI features based on large language models, such as automatic generation of test cases and test data, test instructions in natural language, and control by external AI agents via the Model Context Protocol (MCP).

== Overview ==
QF-Test (the successor of qftestJUI, available since 2001) enables regression and load testing and runs on Windows, Unix and macOS. It is mainly used commercially by testers, developers or business analysts (modelling, low code approaches) with or without programming knowledge as part of software Quality Assurance. Since December 2008, a webtest add-on is available which allows test automation of browser-based GUIs (such as Internet Explorer, Mozilla Firefox, Google Chrome, Apple Safari, and Microsoft Edge) along with extant Java GUI test functions, which was extended to include JavaFX in July 2014. From 2018, QF-Test version 4.2 can test PDF documents, from 2020 native desktop applications (QF-Test version 5) and in 2022, mobile application testing will be added. The basis for efficient use in test automation is stable component recognition (IDs, logical screen elements, labels, CustomWebResolver, SmartID, ...) with low maintenance effort.

== Features ==
General – QF-Test's capture/replay function enables recording of tests for beginners, while modular programming (modularizing) allows creating large test suites in a concise arrangement. For the advanced user who requires even more control over his application, the tool offers access to internal program structures through the standard scripting languages Jython, the Java implementation of the popular Python language, JavaScript, and Groovy.

The tool also offers a batch processing mode, allowing to run tests unattended and then generate XML, HTML and JUnit reports. Thus the tool can be integrated into existing build/test frameworks like Jenkins, Ant or Maven. Another mode is the so-called Daemon mode for distributed test execution.

A specific integration with many test management tools exists. There is a test debugger (enabling arbitrary stepping and editing variables at runtime) and a fully automated dependency management that takes care of pre- and postconditions and helps isolating test cases. Data-driven testing with no need for scripting is possible.

1. Web testing: cross-browser on Internet Explorer, Chrome, Firefox, Microsoft Edge (including Chromium-based), Opera and Safari for static and dynamic websites (HTML5, Ajax, DOM). A headless browser can also be used for testing. QF-Test fully supports frameworks like Angular, React and Vue.js, but also many specific UI toolkits like Smart (GWT), GXT/ExtGWT, ExtJS, ICEfaces, jQuery UI, Kendo UI, PrimeFaces, Qooxdoo, RAP, RichFaces, Vaadin and ZK. Easy integration with Selenium makes it easy to balance development and functional testing. Electron applications can also be tested. Other (e.g., SAP UI5, Siebel Open UI, Salesforce) and future web toolkits can be integrated with little effort. Short-term and individual customisations (CustomWebResolver) are possible via an optimised interface
2. JavaFX, Java Swing, SWT, Eclipse plug-ins and RCP applications and ULC. Support for testing when migrating from JavaSwing or JavaFX to web applications (e.g. via Webswing).
3. Hybrid applications based on multiple technologies are also supported, e.g. applications that integrate HTML content into Java applications using JxBrowser.
4. Windows-based applications (Win32, .NET, Windows Forms, WPF, Windows apps, Qt).
5. Android applications can be tested on real devices and with the Android Studio emulator.
6. iOS applications can also be tested on real devices and with the Xcode Simulator.
7. Testing of PDF documents (document comparisons, checking content, texts, images/graphic objects, layouts, "invisible" or partially hidden objects).
8. QF-Test 9 introduces web accessibility testing to automatically check compliance with WCAG and other standards.
9. QF-Test 10 introduces powerful enhancements for WebAPI testing and AI-assisted validation.
10. With QF-Test 11 test cases can be generated using AI, AI instructions can be embedded into test runs, and custom applications can be made MCP-compatible.

== See also ==
- List of GUI testing tools
- List of web testing tools
- Test automation
- end to end testing
