= Ranorex Studio =

Software test automation tool

Ranorex
- Ranorex Logo

- Developer: Ranorex
- Stable release: 12.5.0 / November 19, 2025
- Operating system: Microsoft Windows
- Type: Test automation
- License: Proprietary
- Website: www.ranorex.com

Ranorex Studio is a GUI test automation framework provided by Ranorex, a software development company. The framework is used for the testing of desktop, web-based and mobile applications.

== Overview ==
Ranorex Studio supports development of automated test modules using standard programming languages such as C# and VB.NET.

=== Main features ===
- GUI object recognition, filtering GUI elements using the company's proprietary technology RanoreXPath.
- Object-based record and replay, using Ranorex Recorder, which records the user's interaction with a desktop or web-based application and creates user-maintainable scripts that can be edited with the Ranorex Studio action editor. The recorded actions are available as both C# and VB.NET code. Record and replay is supported on mobile devices for actions such as key presses and touch gestures.

=== Supported technologies ===
- Windows desktop client applications such as .NET, WPF, Win32, VB6, Java, MFC, Embarcadero Delphi.
- Web technologies such as HTML, HTML5, JavaScript Frameworks, Ajax, Silverlight, Flash, and Flex.
- Cross-browser testing for Chrome, Safari, Microsoft Edge, Internet Explorer, and Firefox
- Mobile Apps
  - native iOS apps
  - native Android apps

=== System environment ===
Ranorex Studio runs on Microsoft Windows and Windows Server. As of version 10.2, Ranorex Studio supports Windows 11

== See also ==
- Test automation
- GUI software testing
- Web testing
  - List of web testing tools
- List of GUI testing tools
