= List of web testing tools =

This list of web testing tools gives a general overview of features of software used for web testing, and sometimes for web scraping.

== Main features ==
Web testing tools may be classified based on different prerequisites that a user may require to test web applications mainly scripting requirements, GUI functionalities and browser compatibility.

Web testing tools	Web browser based (model)	Scriptable	Scripting language	Recorder	Multiple domain	Frames	Open source
Eggplant Functional	Yes (IE, Firefox, Safari, Opera, Chrome)	Yes	SenseTalk	Yes			No
iMacros	Yes (Firefox, Chrome, IE)	Yes	iMacro Script	Yes	Yes	Yes	No
Katalon Studio	Yes (IE, Firefox, Chrome, Safari, Opera, and any modern browser)	Yes	Groovy	Yes	Yes	Yes	No
Playwright	Yes (Chromium, Firefox, WebKit)	Yes	JavaScript, Python, C#, Java	Yes	Yes	Yes	Yes
QF-Test	Yes (Internet Explorer, Chrome, Firefox, Edge (including Chromium-based), Opera, Safari)	Yes	Python, JavaScript, Groovy	Yes	Yes	Yes	No
Ranorex Studio	Yes (Chrome, Firefox, Safari, IE)	Yes	C#, VB.NET	Yes	Yes	Yes	No
Sahi	Yes (IE, Firefox, Chrome, Safari, Opera and any modern browser)	Yes	Sahi Script	Yes	Yes	Yes	Yes
Selenium	Yes (IE, Firefox, Chrome, Safari, Opera, Edge)	Yes	Ruby, Java, Node.js, PHP, Perl, Python, C#, Groovy	Firefox and Chrome	Yes	Yes	Yes
SOAtest	Yes	Yes	Python, JavaScript, Java	Yes	Yes	Yes	No
TestComplete	Yes (IE, Firefox, Chrome)	Yes	VBScript, JScript, C++Script, C#Script, DelphiScript, Python	Yes	Yes	Yes	No
Test Studio	Yes (Chrome, Firefox, Safari, IE)	Yes	C#, VB.NET	Yes	Yes	Yes	No
Tricentis Tosca	Yes (Chrome, Firefox, IE, Edge)	Yes	C#, VB.NET	Yes	Yes	Yes	No
WatiN	Yes (IE, Firefox)	Yes	C#, ability to run JavaScript from C# calls	IE/FF		Yes	Yes
Watir	Yes (IE, Firefox, Chrome, Safari, Opera, Edge)	Yes	Ruby	No	Yes	Yes	Yes
HP-UFT	Yes (IE, Firefox, Chrome, Safari, Opera, Edge)	Yes	VBScript	Yes	Yes	Yes	No

== See also ==
- Comparison of GUI testing tools
- Headless browser
