= Get Wet =

Get Wet may refer to:

- Get Wet (band), a 1980s pop group
- Get Wet (Krewella album), 2013
- Get Wet (Mental As Anything album), 1979
- The Get Wets, rhythm and blues band

== See also ==
- I Get Wet, 2001 album by Andrew W.K.
- "Get It Wet", 1997 song by Twista
- Getting wet (disambiguation)
- Wet (disambiguation)
