= BrowserStack =

Software company based in India

- Type: Private
- Industry: Enterprise software, Software testing
- Founded: 2011
- Founder: Ritesh Arora, Nakul Aggarwal
- Headquarters: Mumbai, India
- Area served: Worldwide
- Key people: Ritesh Arora (Co-founder & CEO); Nakul Aggarwal (Co-founder & CTO)
- Revenue: $225 million (2025)
- Number of employees: 1200+ (March 2025)
- Website: browserstack.com

BrowserStack is a cloud-based software testing platform founded in 2011. It provides tools for testing websites and mobile applications across multiple devices, browsers, and operating systems. The company is headquartered in Mumbai, with additional offices in San Francisco, New York, and Ireland.

== History ==
BrowserStack was co-founded in 2011 by Ritesh Arora and Nakul Aggarwal, alumni of the Indian Institute of Technology Bombay. The company provides access to thousands of real devices and browsers for software testing. The concept for the company developed while the founders were working on a consulting project called Downcase. During this time, they began working on a tool to simplify software testing. A beta version of BrowserStack was released after four months of development and attracted approximately 10,000 users. A commercial version followed, and the company became profitable within six months of launch. The platform was originally started as a service to let developers test their websites on Internet Explorer. In October 2015, BrowserStack was recognised as a Bootstrap Champ in The Economic Times Startup Awards.

BrowserStack remained a bootstrapped company during its early years. By 2018, the company reported more than 25,000 paying customers, over 1.6 million developers using its platform, and approximately 125 employees across offices in Mumbai, Dublin, and San Francisco.

In January 2018, BrowserStack raised $50 million in Series A funding from Accel. In July 2020, it acquired Percy, a San Francisco-based visual testing platform. A $200 million Series B funding round in June 2021, led by BOND with participation from Insight Partners and Accel, valued the company at $4 billion. That year, it was described as one of several Indian SaaS companies to achieve unicorn status. The company adopted a remote-first work model in 2021.

In December 2021, BrowserStack acquired Nightwatch.js, an open-source test automation framework. In August 2024, the company acquired Bird Eats Bug, a bug reporting and debugging platform, for $20 million. In May 2025, it acquired Requestly, an HTTP interception and mocking tool backed by Y Combinator, for an undisclosed amount. In June 2025, BrowserStack announced the addition of AI-based tools to its software testing platform.

As of 2025, BrowserStack is reported to support over three million tests daily for over seven million developers and testers and 50,000 teams, including clients such as Amazon, Microsoft, and NVIDIA.

In January 2026, the company announced a $125 million employee stock ownership plan (ESOP) and a share repurchase programme. The company described the transaction as its third share buyback and said it was available to current and former employees and early investors.

== Products and services ==
BrowserStack's products include Live, App Live, Automate, App Automate and Percy. Launched in 2023, Test Observability is a test analytics platform for tracking execution data across CI pipelines.

The platform integrates with other software testing frameworks such as Selenium IDE, Testim, Katalon and Playwright, and is used in 135 countries and the company operates 21 global data centers.

In August 2024, the company launched Bug Capture (Bird Eats Bug), a manual bug-reporting and screen-recording tool. In September 2024, BrowserStack launched App Accessibility Testing to assess mobile applications against the Web Content Accessibility Guidelines (WCAG). In November 2024, the company introduced Low-Code Automation, an AI-based tool for creating and managing automated tests without direct code writing. In January 2025, the United States District Court for the Eastern District of Virginia dismissed a lawsuit filed by Deque Systems concerning BrowserStack’s accessibility testing products; the court dismissed the complaint in its entirety. In February 2025, the company launched an AI-based testing platform that integrates several stages of the software testing process. In March 2025, the company introduced Private Devices, providing enterprise customers with access to dedicated real devices hosted in secure data centers.

In June 2025, BrowserStack introduced BrowserStack AI and BrowserStack MCP Server. The company also updated its Test Management platform to incorporate automated test case generation and test failure analysis. In July 2025, the company released the Accessibility Design Toolkit, a Figma plugin for automated accessibility checks. In August 2025, BrowserStack released Testing Toolkit, a Google Chrome extension designed for manual web testing, including cross-browser checks, accessibility auditing, and bug reporting. In October 2025, the company introduced the Visual Review Agent for its visual testing platform Percy.

== Research and reports ==
In 2026, BrowserStack published the State of AI in Software Testing 2026 report, which examined the adoption of ai in software testing workflows.

== Recognition ==
In 2015, BrowserStack received the "Bootstrap Champ" award at the Economic Times Startup Awards. In 2021, the company’s co-founders Nakul Aggarwal and Ritesh Arora were listed in the Hurun India Rich List among self-made entrepreneurs in India under 40. In 2023, Aggarwal was included in the Economic Times 40 Under Forty list. BrowserStack was named to the Forbes Cloud 100 in 2024 and 2025 and received a Forbes India Leadership Award in the "Outstanding Startup" category in 2025.
