= Accelq =

Software testing platform

ACCELQ Inc.
- Type: Private
- Industry: Enterprise software Software testing
- Founded: 2014
- Founder: Mahendra Alladi
- Headquarters: Dallas, Texas, United States
- Key people: Mahendra Alladi (Founder & CEO)
- Website: Official website

ACCELQ Inc. is a cloud-based software testing platform founded in 2014. It is a platform for testing web & mobile applications across multiple devices, browsers, and operating systems.Headquartered in Dallas, Texas, the company operates additional offices in India, Canada, and Australia.

== History ==
The company was founded in 2014 by Mahendra Alladi. The platform was launched in 2016, focusing on codeless automation for web and mobile applications. Between 2018 and 2024, the company expanded its operations to India, Canada, and Australia.

In 2025, the company integrated generative AI features into its platform under the name Autopilot, to support automated test case generation.

== Recognition ==
In 2020, ACCELQ was included in Forrester Research's The Forrester Wave: Continuous Functional Test Automation Suites, Q2 2020, and was later included in The Forrester Wave: Continuous Automation Testing Platforms, Q4 2022. Additionally, the company was listed in the Deloitte Technology Fast 500 for North America in 2022 and 2023.

== See also ==
- Software testing
- Test automation
- Graphical user interface testing
