= Silk Test =

Software test automation

- Developer: OpenText
- Stable release: 21.0 / November 2020; 6 years ago
- Operating system: Microsoft Windows
- Available in: English, Japanese, Chinese (simplified)
- Type: Test automation
- License: Proprietary
- Website: www.microfocus.com/products/silk-portfolio/silk-test/

Silk Test is a tool for automated function and regression testing of enterprise applications. It was originally developed by Segue Software which was acquired by Borland in 2006. Borland was acquired by Micro Focus International in 2009 and Micro Focus was later acquired by OpenText in 2023. The original name for the product from 1993 through 1996 was QA Partner.

Silk Test offers various clients:

- Silk Test Workbench allows automation testing on a visual level (similar to former TestPartner) as well as using VB.Net as scripting language
- Silk Test Classic uses the domain specific 4Test language for automation scripting. It is an object oriented language similar to C++. It uses the concepts of classes, objects, and inheritance.
- Silk4J renamed UFT Developer allows automation in Eclipse using Java as scripting language
- Silk4Net renamed UFT Developer allows the same in Visual Studio using VB or C#

== Features ==
Silk Test Client is an IDE for creating, maintaining and executing tests.

- Silk Test Agent: translates the script commands into GUI commands (User actions). These commands can be executed on the same machine as the host or on a remote machine.

Silk Test identifies all windows and controls of the application under test as objects and defines all of the properties and attributes of each window. Thus it supports an object-based implementation.

Silk Test supports both recording and descriptive programming methods to identify and verify the elements in the AUT. It also identifies any mouse movements and keystrokes, enabling testing against custom objects in the AUT.

Silk Test supports testing of different technologies: Mobile (iOS, Android), .NET (WinForms, WPF), Java (Swing, SWT), DOM, IE, Firefox, Chrome, Edge, Safari, SAP Windows GUI.

== History ==
- 1993-1996: QA Partner (Segue Software).
- 1996: QA Partner was renamed to Silk Test.
- 2006: Borland acquired Segue Software.
- 2009: Micro Focus International acquired Borland and the Quality Solutions (including the automation tool TestPartner) part of Compuware.
- 2009: Introduction of Silk4J.
- 2010: Introduction of Silk Test Workbench (the successor of TestPartner) and Silk4NET. Silk Test is now used for the overall functional testing solution at Micro Focus International and the 4Test client has been renamed to Silk Test Classic.
- 2017: Introduction of Silk WebDriver, a free derivative of Silk Test for recording and replaying Selenium scripts.
- 2023: OpenText acquired Micro Focus International.

== See also ==
- Test automation
- List of GUI testing tools
