= Nayana Udupi =

Indian transgender rights advocate

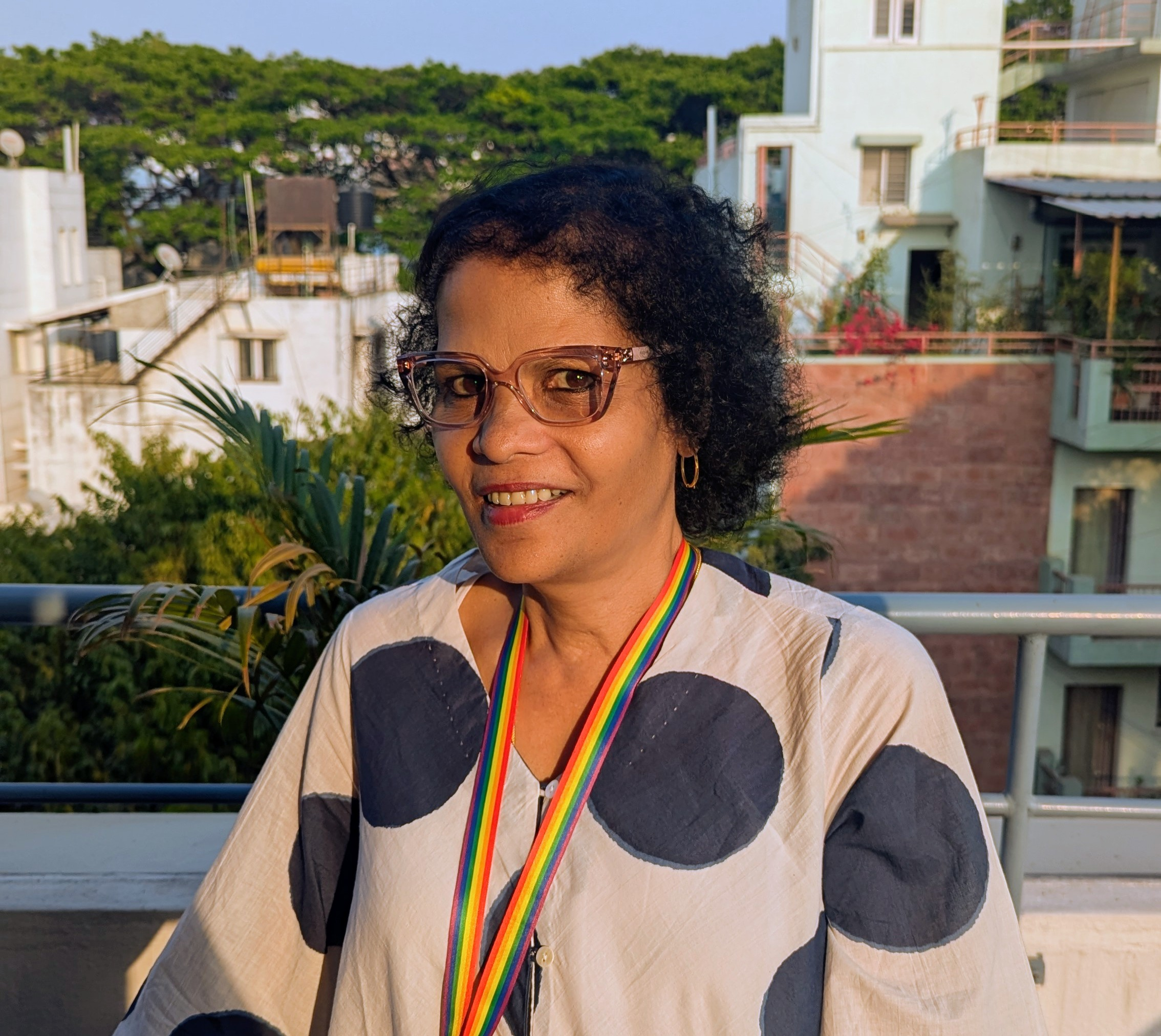
- Nayana Udupi in 2025
- Born: 1972 or 1973 (age 53–54); Mangaluru, Karnataka, India

Nayana Udupi (born 1972 or 1973) is an Indian transgender woman who has established a career in the corporate sector while advocating for workplace inclusivity.

== Early life ==
Nayana was born as a male in Udupi, Karnataka, to Rama Sherigara and Susheela, who managed a small shop. She is the eldest of five children. During her early years, she exhibited feminine traits, enjoying wearing sarees and salwar kameez, and playing with girls. After completing her 10th grade, her parents sent her to Kolar Gold Fields (KGF) for foreman training, hoping to change her behaviour. However, she faced constant ridicule and bullying from other boys in the hostel, leading her to leave KGF and move to Bengaluru. There, at the age of 17, she worked as a receptionist in a lodge during the night and pursued her II PUC in Arts during the day.

== Career challenges ==
After completing an advanced diploma course in design, Nayana began searching for employment in 2000. Initially, she secured freelance projects; however, after people got to know her identity as a transgender, she experienced employment difficulties. She later joined a transgender community in Pune, where she spent three years undergoing gender reassignment procedures. Unwilling to continue a life dependent on begging, she enrolled in a computer skills and multimedia course. Despite facing over 20 job rejections in three months due to her transgender identity, she returned to Bengaluru. To sustain herself, she took on small roles as an extra in movies, working in movies featuring actors like Jaya Prada and the Puneeth Rajkumar. She then got a job at an administrative position at a non-governmental organization (NGO), Sangama, that works with sexual minorities.

== Corporate career ==
Nayana's career progressed when she joined Thoughtworks India as a vendor manager. Initially, she interacted with the marketing team weekly. Although her design expertise did not align with immediate business requirements, ThoughtWorks enrolled her in a graphic design course. Over time, her responsibilities expanded to include vendor management and design projects. The company also implemented sensitization initiatives to create an inclusive workplace for her after she joined the organisation.

== Advocacy and support ==
As a champion of Diversity and Inclusion (D&I), Nayana has hosted over 20 sessions across various forums in India, focusing on gender sensitization. She has also been featured in a coffee table book highlighting the success stories of 75 transgender individuals, released in April 2022 by actor Akshay Kumar. In 2018, she walked the ramp for a fashion brand. In addition to her corporate role, Nayana supports members of the transgender community seeking employment in the corporate sector. She shares her experiences and provides guidance on professional development and workplace integration.

== Personal life ==
As of 2022, Nayana maintains a close relationship with her mother, Susheela, who has been a constant support and resides in Udupi. They communicate daily. In her leisure time, Nayana enjoys gardening, drawing, and traveling, having visited over 15 cities. She remains single and continues to balance her professional responsibilities with her personal interests. She enjoys wearing saris to work.
