= Twist (software) =

- Developer: ThoughtWorks Studios
- Initial release: October 6, 2008
- Stable release: 14.1.0 / March 18, 2014
- Type: Test automation, Agile testing
- License: Shareware
- Website: www.thoughtworks-studios.com/agile-test-automation

Twist is a test automation and functional testing solution built by Thoughtworks Studios, the software division of ThoughtWorks. It uses Behavior Driven Development (BDD) and Test-driven development (TDD) for functional testing of the application. It is a part of the Adaptive ALM solution consisting of Twist for Agile testing by ThoughtWorks Studios, Mingle for Agile project management and Go for Agile release management.

Twist is no longer supported by ThoughtWorks.

== Features ==
- Twist allows test specifications to be written in English or any UTF-8 supported language.
  - Test implementation is done using Java or Groovy.
- Twist's IDE supports manual, automated and hybrid testing.
- Twist can be used with any Java based driver. It provides support for
  - Selenium and Sahi for testing web-based applications
  - SWTBot for testing Eclipse/SWT applications
  - Frankenstein for testing Java Swing applications
  - Calabash for testing Android and iOS applications
- Fast Script Development
  - Consolidation of redundant code (refactoring as “Concepts”)
  - Type Ahead and Suggestion
- Team coding
  - Version control, organization, and searching in Confluence
  - Shared script libraries
  - Tagging (Test/Production, Categories, etc.) with Filters
    - Filter scripts based on Tags
    - Run groups of tests based on Tags
