= Globalization (disambiguation) =

Globalization is the process of interaction and integration among people, companies, and governments worldwide.

Globalization may also refer to:

- Globalization (album), by Pitbull, 2014
- Globalizations, a peer-reviewed academic journal
- Internationalization and localization of software and websites
- Globalize (JavaScript library)

== See also ==
- Globalism
- Trade-to-GDP ratio, a measure of the importance of international trade in the economy of a country
