= Linux Desktop Testing Project =

Testing tool that uses computer assistive technology

- Developer(s): Emily Chen, Nagappan A., et al.
- Initial release: January 28, 2005; 20 years ago
- Stable release: 3.5.0 / May 1, 2013; 11 years ago
- Repository: github.com/ldtp/ldtp2
- Written in: Python, C#
- Operating system: Linux, macOS, Windows
- Type: Automated testing
- License: GNU LGPL
- Website: ldtp.freedesktop.org

The Linux Desktop Testing Project (LDTP) is a testing tool that uses computer assistive technology to automate graphical user interface (GUI) testing. The GUI functionality of an application can be tested in Linux, macOS, Windows, Solaris, FreeBSD, and embedded system environments. The macOS version is named PyATOM, and the Windows version is Cobra. The LDTP is released as free and open-source software under the GNU Lesser General Public License (LGPL).

LDTP can test any accessibility-enabled GNOME application, Mozilla, OpenOffice.org, any Swing-based Java, Qt 4-based and KDE 4.x applications.

LDTP is/was used by the following companies and organizations:

- GNOME
- Mozilla
- Openoffice.org
- KDE
- Novell/SuSE
- Palm Source
- VMware

LDTP can be used to remotely test applications.

== History ==
LDTP version 0.1.0 was released in January 2005 and then showcased and discussed at GNOME Users And Developers European Conference (GUADEC) 2005. It was then used at the Google Summer of Code in 2006 for Tinderbox integration, Evolution automation, and LDTP regression suite under GNOME organization. Then again in 2007, it was used by the Mozilla Foundation for Firefox automation and Tinderbox integration.

== Example ==
This is an example of how LDTP would test writing in gedit:

#!/usr/bin/env python3

# The standard import stuff.
from ldtp import *
from ooldtp import context as locate
from time import sleep

# Here we open the app.
launchapp("gedit")

# Now we find it and make sure it is open.
gedit_win = locate("*gedit")
gedit_win.waittillguiexist()

# Now we type into gedit.
text_field = gedit_win.getchild("txt1")
text_field.enterstring("G'Day mate!")

# Save a picture to prove we did it.
imagecapture("*gedit", "/tmp/foo.png")

# Quit gedit.
quit = gedit_win.getchild("mnuQuit")
quit.selectmenuitem()

# Close without saving.
dont_save = locate("Question")
dont_save.waittillguiexist()

button = dont_save.getchild("btnClosewithoutSaving")
button.click()

# Wait until gedit is gone.
gedit_win.waittillguinotexist()

== Diagram of how LDTP works ==
How LDTP works

== See also ==
- List of Linux GUI testing tools
- Desktop Linux
