= Getting wet =

Getting wet may refer to:

- Coming to be affected by moisture
- Coming to be affected by wetting
- The onset of vaginal lubrication

== See also ==
- Get Wet (disambiguation)
- Wet (disambiguation)
