= Lightweight software test automation =

Lightweight software test automation is the process of creating and using relatively short and simple computer programs, called lightweight test harnesses, designed to test a software system. Lightweight test automation harnesses are not tied to a particular programming language but are most often implemented with the Java, Perl, Visual Basic .NET, and C# programming languages. Lightweight test automation harnesses are generally four pages of source code or less, and are generally written in four hours or less. Lightweight test automation is often associated with Agile software development methodology.

The three major alternatives to the use of lightweight software test automation are commercial test automation frameworks, open source test automation frameworks, and heavyweight test automation. The primary disadvantage of lightweight test automation is manageability. Because lightweight automation is relatively quick and easy to implement, a test effort can be overwhelmed with harness programs, test case data files, test result files, and so on. However, lightweight test automation has significant advantages. Compared with commercial frameworks, lightweight automation is less expensive in initial cost and is more flexible. Compared with open source frameworks, lightweight automation is more stable because there are fewer updates and external dependencies. Compared with heavyweight test automation, lightweight automation is quicker to implement and modify. Lightweight test automation is generally used to complement, not replace these alternative approaches.

Lightweight test automation is most useful for regression testing, where the intention is to verify that new source code added to the system under test has not created any new software failures. Lightweight test automation may be used for other areas of software testing such as performance testing, stress testing, load testing, security testing, code coverage analysis, mutation testing, and so on. The most widely published proponent of the use of lightweight software test automation is Dr. James D. McCaffrey.

== See also ==
- Test automation
- Microsoft Visual Test
- iMacros
- Software testing
