= KDT =

KDT may refer to:

- KDT Nacional, an association football club in Peru
- Keyword-driven testing, of software
- Kilusang Diwa ng Taguig, a Philippine political party
- Knights of the Dinner Table, a comic book
- Kamphaeng Saen Airport, Nakhon Pathom, Thailand (IATA:KDT)
- A Kleinladungsträger or euro container
