= TestPartner =

Software

- Developer: Micro Focus
- Stable release: 6.3.2
- Operating system: Microsoft Windows
- Type: Test automation
- License: Proprietary
- Website: TestPartner

TestPartner is a GUI software testing tool from Micro Focus that is intended to enable software development project teams to functionally automate and test application graphical user interfaces, with the goal of being able to accomplish more application testing in a given amount of time than could be performed manually.

On 6 May 2009, Micro Focus announced the purchase of the Quality Solutions part of Compuware which included TestPartner. Borland acquired the rights and support of TestPartner as Silk Test Partner, but the product has been discontinued in favor of Silk Test and will continue to provide support only.

== Methods ==
TestPartner provides two primary methods for functional test development:

1. Code-oriented development using Microsoft Visual Basic for Applications (VBA), which has been licensed from Microsoft. With VBA users have access to a rich integrated development environment (IDE) that provides the core VisualBasic application libraries, as well as all of the capabilities inherent in VBA (debugging, error handling, ability to reference public libraries, etc.). Compuware TestPartner also provides a predefined library of VBA-based functionality specifically intended for use in functional test automation.
2. A visual storyboard-based environment for developing functional test automation. This interface has been termed a "Visual Navigator" in the product literature. This capability provides users with a Screen Preview (screenshot of application screen being automated), a list of test automation steps being performed against the Screen, and a Storyboard which provides the context of a series of test steps against multiple screen previews. This approach also provides users with access to a standard test automation functionality, as well as the ability to add various types of test logic, variabilization, etc.
