= Wet =

Wet may refer to:

- Moisture, the condition of containing liquid or being covered or saturated in liquid
- Wetting (or wetness), a measure of how well a liquid sticks to a solid rather than forming a sphere on the surface

Wet or WET may also refer to:

== Arts and entertainment ==
=== Film ===
- Wet (film), a 1995 film, later compiled in Tales of Erotica

=== Games ===
- Wet (video game), a 2009 video game
- Wolfenstein: Enemy Territory, a 2003 video game
- Lula: The Sexy Empire, also titled Wet: The Sexy Empire, a 1998 computer game

=== Music ===
- Wet (band), an American indie pop group
- Wet (album), by Barbra Streisand
- "Wet" (Nicole Scherzinger song), a song from the album Killer Love (2011)
- "Wet" (Snoop Dogg song), the lead single from the album Doggumentary
- "Wet" (YFN Lucci song), the lead single from the mixtape Wish Me Well 3

=== Other media ===
- Wet (magazine), a magazine about "gourmet bathing" in the late 1970s

== Businesses ==
- WET (company), a water feature design firm
- Wet Lubricants, a brand of personal lubricants

== Economics ==
- Wine equalisation tax (WET), a tax for wine in Australia

== Places ==
- Wet Mountains, in southern Colorado
- Wet Moor, an ecosystem in Somerset, UK
- Wet Lake (Kuyavia-Pomerania Voivodeship), Poland
- Wet Lake (Warmia-Masuria Voivodeship), Poland
- Wet Hollow

== Transport ==
- Weeton railway station, North Yorkshire, England, National Rail station code

== In science and technology ==
- "Wet", in audio signal processing, a descriptor of audio processed with reverb and delay
- WET, an acronym for "Write Everything Twice" which can be opposed to DRY (Don't repeat yourself)
- WET Web Tester, an automated web testing tool
- Weightless environmental testing, or simulated weightlessness, often achieved via neutral buoyancy simulation
- Whole Earth Telescope, a network of telescopes for performing round the clock astronomical observations
- Whole effluent toxicity, a measure used by the US Environmental Protection Agency
- Phencyclidine (PCP), a dissociative anesthetic
- Wireless Energy Transmission, a transmission of electrical energy without wires as a physical link

== Other uses ==
- Wets, members of the British Conservative Party who opposed some of Prime Minister Margaret Thatcher's policies
- Wets, opponents of prohibition in the United States
- Wet market, a type of marketplace specializing in fresh meat, fish, and produce
- Wat (food), a stew in Ethiopian and Eritrean cuisine
- Western European Time, UTC+00:00, the time zone of Iceland, Ireland, Portugal, the UK and other countries
- Wetarese language (ISO 639 code), spoken on the island of Wetar, Indonesia
- Wuest Expanded Translation, a 1961 translation of the New Testament by Kenneth Wuest
- A slang word for vaginal lubrication, usually as a result of sexual arousal

== See also ==
- Wet dream
- Bedwetting
- Urinary incontinence
- De Wet (disambiguation)
