= Ritesh Arora =

Indian entrepreneur

- Born: Mumbai, Maharashtra, India
- Education: Indian Institute of Technology Bombay (B.Tech, 2006)
- Occupations: Entrepreneur, angel investor
- Organization: BrowserStack
- Title: Co-Founder and CEO

Ritesh Arora is an Indian entrepreneur and angel investor. He is the co-founder and chief executive officer (CEO) of BrowserStack, a software testing platform.

== Early life and education ==
Ritesh Arora graduated from the Indian Institute of Technology Bombay in 2006 with a degree in computer science and engineering.

== Career ==
Arora and Nakul Aggarwal founded BrowserStack in Mumbai in 2011 while working on a consulting venture called Downcase. They developed a beta version of the cross-browser testing platform before launching it commercially later that year.

As CEO, Arora was involved in expanding BrowserStack from its initial product into a suite of over 15 tools. By 2015, the company reported users in 135 countries, with clients that included Microsoft, Facebook, Twitter, Walt Disney, Airbnb, and Tesco. That year, it received recognition as the Bootstrap Champ at The Economic Times Startup Awards.

In 2018, BrowserStack raised US$50 million in Series A funding from Accel. The company also established offices in San Francisco and New York, and opened a development base in Ireland as part of its international expansion.

As of 2021, BrowserStack's tools were reported to facilitate more than three million tests daily for over 50,000 teams globally. That same year, the company was valued at $4 billion following a $200 million Series B funding round led by BOND. In a 2025 interview with Forbes India, Arora stated that the company was considering expanding its services beyond testing infrastructure. He also referred to the use of artificial intelligence in software testing.

== Philanthropy ==
In April 2025, Arora and Aggarwal pledged Rs.100 crore to IIT Bombay to support student housing and campus infrastructure projects, including the reconstruction of Hostel 6 and upgrades under Project Evergreen.

== Recognition ==
In 2021, Ritesh Arora was listed in the Hurun India Rich List among self-made entrepreneurs in India under 40 with an estimated net worth of Rs. 12,400 crore.
