= Oracle Application Testing Suite =

Testing suite developed by Oracle

Oracle Application Testing Suite is a comprehensive, integrated testing solution for Web applications, Web Services, packaged Oracle Applications and Oracle Databases.

== Description/History ==
Oracle regularly releases updates to the Oracle Application Testing Suite. These updates often include new features, improvements to existing features, and better compatibility with evolving technologies.

The test solution was originally developed by RSW, who was bought by Teradyne that created the software and call center test company Empirix. Empirix eTest Suite was acquired by Oracle in June 2008 and was rebranded as Oracle Application Testing Suite.

The Oracle Application Testing Suite is part of the Oracle Enterprise Manager product family and comprises the following tightly integrated products:

- Oracle Load Testing for scalability, performance and load testing.
- Oracle Functional Testing for automated functional and regression testing.
  - Oracle Flow Builder is introduced as part of Functional testing along with the Release of OATS 12.3.0
- Oracle Test Manager for test process management, including test requirements management, test management, test execution and defect tracking.

Oracle Application Testing Suite also provides a series of integrated testing accelerators for testing Oracle packaged applications and SOA applications.

These accelerators enable enhanced scripting capabilities for more efficient and optimized testing.

== Supported technology/Applications ==
Web/HTML, Adobe Flex, Siebel, Oracle E-business Suite, Oracle Fusion Applications, JD Edwards EnterpriseOne, Application Development Framework, Oracle Forms, Web Services, Oracle Databases

=== Scripting platform ===
Oracle Application Testing Suite have one unified scripting platform called OpenScript. This is an Eclipse-based scripting platform that provides a graphical user interface and the possibility to extend scripts by using Java code.

=== Languages ===
Oracle Functional Testing and Oracle Load Testing both uses the same scripting platform (OpenScript) and scripts may be extended by using the Java programming language.

== License models ==
Oracle Functional Testing is licensed based on NUP (Named User Plus). Oracle Test Manager is licensed based on NUP (Named user Plus). Oracle Load Testing is licensed based on:

- Number of processors for the Load Testing Controller
- Number of virtual users to be simulated

The base license covers web applications support. Additional accelerators may be licensed as needed.

== Compatibility for Functional Testing ==
OATS (Oracle Applications Testing Suite) has evolved adding compatibility with different operating systems, Java versions, browsers, etc.

Latest Version of 12.5 supports

Browsers:

- Record and Playback on
  - IE 8.x, 9.x, 10.x and 11.x
  - Firefox (ESR) 10.x, 17.x, 24.x and 31.x
- Playback on
  - Chrome 32+

Java Runtime Environment:

- JRE 1.6
- JRE 1.7
- JRE 1.8

Operating System: 32 bit and 64 bit of

- Windows 2003
- Windows 7
- Windows 8
- Windows 2008
- Windows 2008 R2
- Windows 2012 Server
