= Appium =

Automation for Apps

Appium is an open source automation tool for running scripts and testing native applications, mobile-web applications and hybrid applications on Android or iOS using a webdriver.

== History ==
Appium was originally developed by Dan Cuellar in 2011 under the name "iOSAuto", written in the C# programming language. The program was open-sourced in August 2012 using the Apache 2 license. In January 2013, Sauce Labs agreed to fund Appium's development and motivated its code to be rewritten using Node.js.

Appium won the 2014 Bossie award of InfoWorld for the best open source desktop and mobile software. Appium was also selected as an Open Source Rookie of the Year by Black Duck Software.

In October 2016, Appium joined the JS Foundation. Initially as a mentor program, it graduated in August 2017.
