= UFT One =

Software testing automation tool

OpenText UFT One
- UFT Icon
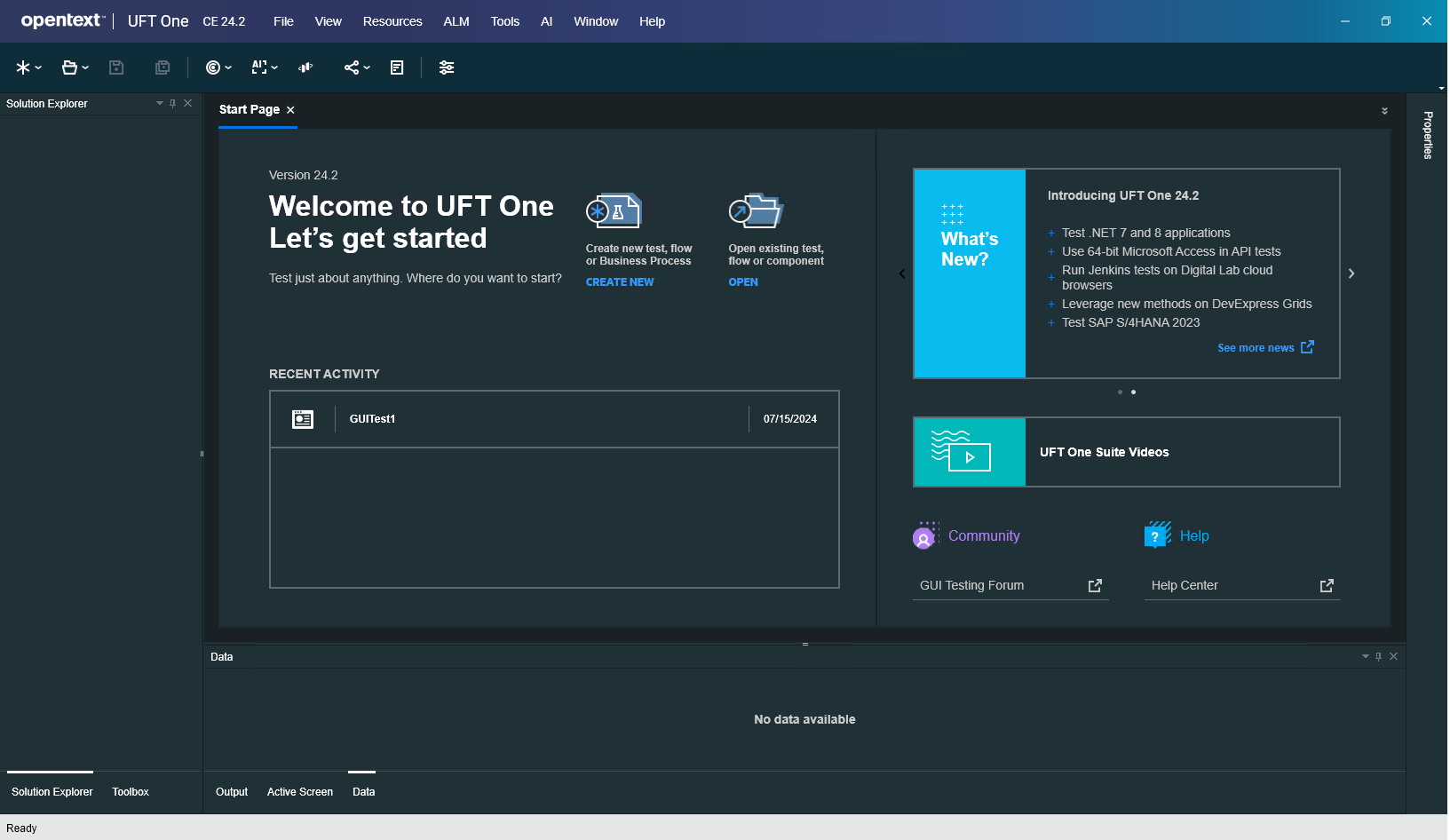
- Start Page
- Developer: OpenText
- Stable release: 24.2 / April 17, 2024; 2 years ago
- Operating system: Microsoft Windows
- Type: Test automation tools
- License: Proprietary
- Website: www.opentext.com/products/uft-one

OpenText UFT One is an AI-powered functional testing tool, accelerates test automation across desktop, web, mobile, mainframe, composite, and packaged enterprise-grade applications.

It was formerly known as Micro Focus Unified Functional Testing and QuickTest Professional (QTP).

UFT One supports keyword and scripting interfaces and features a graphical user interface. It uses the Visual Basic Scripting Edition (VBScript) scripting language to specify a test procedure, and to manipulate the objects and controls of the application under test. UFT allows developers to test all three layers of a program's operations from a single console: the interface, the service layer and the database layer.

UFT was originally written by Mercury Interactive and called QuickTest Professional. Mercury Interactive was subsequently acquired by Hewlett-Packard (HP) in 2006. UFT 11.5 combined HP QuickTest Professional and HP Service Test into a single software package, which was available from the HP Software Division until 2016, when the division was ultimately sold to Micro Focus.

Micro Focus was acquired by OpenText in 2023.

== Description ==
OpenText UFT One is automated testing software designed for testing various software applications and environments. It performs functional and regression testing through a user interface such as a native GUI or web interface. It works by identifying the objects in the application user interface or a web page and performing desired operations (such as mouse clicks or keyboard events); it can also capture object properties like name or handler ID. HPE Unified Functional Testing uses a VBScript scripting language to specify the test procedure and to manipulate the objects and controls of the application under test. To perform more sophisticated actions, users may need to manipulate the underlying VBScript.

Although UFT is usually used for "UI based" test case automation, it also can automate some "non-UI" based test cases, such as file system operations, database testing, Web services testing and API testing.

=== Exception handling ===
OpenText UFT One manages exception handling using recovery scenarios; the goal is to continue running tests if an unexpected failure occurs. Because UFT hooks into the memory space of the applications being tested, some exceptions may cause HPE Unified Functional Testing to terminate and be unrecoverable.

=== Data-driven testing ===
OpenText UFT One supports data-driven testing. For example, data can be output to a data table for reuse elsewhere. Data-driven testing is implemented as a Microsoft Excel workbook that can be accessed from UFT. UFT has two types of data tables: the Global data sheet and Action (local) data sheets. The test steps can read data from these data tables in order to drive variable data into the application under test, and verify the expected result.

=== Automating custom and complex UI objects ===
OpenText UFT One may not recognize customized user interface objects and other complex objects. Users can define these types of objects as virtual objects or as insight objects (bitmap comparison). UFT does not support virtual objects for analog recording or recording in low-level mode.

=== Extensibility ===
OpenText UFT One can be extended with separate add-ins for a number of development environments that are not supported out-of-the-box. UFT add-ins include support for Web, .NET, Java, and Delphi. HP QuickTest Professional and the HP QuickTest Professional add-ins are packaged together in HP Functional Testing software.

== User interface ==
OpenText UFT One provides two views—and ways to modify—a test script: Keyword View and Expert View. These views enable UFT to act as an Integrated Development Environment (IDE) for the test, and UFT includes many standard IDE features, such as breakpoints to pause a test at predetermined places.

=== Keyword view ===
Keyword View lets users create and view the steps of a test in a modular, table format. Each row in the table represents a step that can be modified. The Keyword View can also contain any of the following columns: Item, Operation, Value, Assignment, Comment, and Documentation. For every step in the Keyword View, UFT displays a corresponding line of script based on the row and column value. Users can add, delete or modify steps at any point.

In Keyword View, users can also view properties for items such as checkpoints, output values, and actions, use conditional and loop statements, and insert breakpoints to assist in debugging a test.

=== Expert view ===
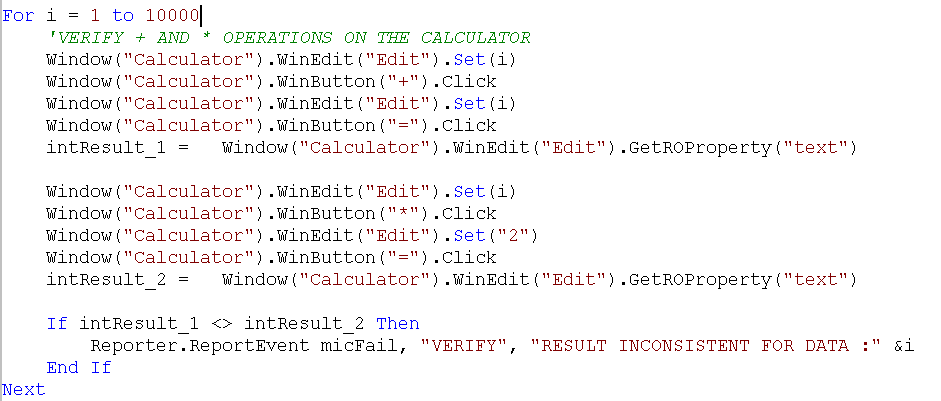
VBScript code in Expert View

In Expert View, UFT lets users display and edit a test's source code using VBScript. Designed for more advanced users, users can edit all test actions except for the root Global action, and changes are synchronized with the Keyword View.

=== Languages ===
OpenText UFT One uses VBScript as its scripting language. VBScript supports classes but not polymorphism and inheritance. Compared with Visual Basic for Applications (VBA), VBScript lacks the ability to use some Visual Basic keywords, does not come with an integrated debugger, lacks an event handler, and does not have a forms editor. HP added a debugger, but the functionality is more limited when compared with testing tools that integrate a full-featured IDE, such as those provided with VBA, Java, or VB.NET.

Some Windows script (WScript, WSH, WMI) and VB.Net code can be used in a script in the expert view.

=== Drawbacks ===
OpenText UFT One runs primarily in Windows environments. It relies on largely obsolete Windows-only technologies such as ActiveX and VBScript which is not an object-oriented language.

OpenText UFT One cannot test with all browser types and versions. In particular it does not support Opera.

The Test Execution engine is combined with the GUI Test Code development IDE, so there is no way to run the tests independent of UFT, even though remote execution is still possible with HPE Unified Functional Testing running on a different machine.

High licensing costs often mean that the tool is not widely used in an organization, but instead is limited to a smaller testing team. This encourages a siloed approach to QA/testing where testing is performed as a separate phase rather than a collaborative approach where QA/testers work closely with the business and development teams (as is advocated by newer agile approaches to software development).

== Integration ==
OpenText UFT One and Quality Center work together for additional testing capabilities. Users can use HP Quality Center with UFT assets, such as tests, shared object repositories, libraries, recovery scenarios and external data tables.

HP Application Lifecycle Management (ALM) enables IT staff in multiple roles to manage activities associated with their core application lifecycle, from requirements through development, testing, defect management and readiness for delivery. The software was tailored to work with a number of testing tools, including UFT, to test for functional defects in the code.

== See also ==
- Test automation
- GUI software testing
