= Sauce Labs =

Software company in California, US

Sauce Labs Inc.
- Type: Enterprise software, web development, Mobile app development
- Industry: Software industry
- Founded: 2008; 18 years ago
- Founders: Jason Huggins, Steven Hazel, John Dunham, Al Sargent
- Headquarters: San Francisco, California, United States
- Key people: Prince Kohli, Chief Executive Officer; Shubha Govil, Chief Product Officer; Anoop Tripathi, Chief Technical Officer
- Website: saucelabs.com

Sauce Labs is an American cloud-based software testing company that provides a unified platform for quality assurance across the software development lifecycle (SDLC). It is headquartered in San Francisco, California.

== History ==
Sauce Labs was founded in August 2008 by Jason Huggins, a software engineer known for creating the Selenium testing framework.

In December 2016, the company announced the acquisition of Test Object, a real device mobile app testing platform.

In April 2019, Sauce Labs announced an addition to its platform, Sauce Performance, providing developers with the ability to measure application performance metrics early in the software development phase. These performance metrics include time to first meaningful paint, time to first interactive, page weight and speed Index. The product uses algorithms to establish a baseline that can be used for regression testing. The company also announced in April that it had acquired Screener.io, a provider of cloud-based automated visual regression testing, including Storybook Component testing.

In December 2020, the company completed the acquisition of API Fortress, a provider of automated APP testing solutions for developers and DevOps teams. In February 2021, Sauce Labs announced that they had entered into a definitive agreement to acquire scriptless testing software provider, AutonomIQ. Sauce Labs announced in March 2021 that it had acquired TestFairy, an Israeli-based company that provides a platform for developers to test and distribute beta versions of mobile applications. In July, 2021 the company completed the acquisition of Backtrace I/O Inc., a provider of production error monitoring and tracing for development and QA teams.

In February 2025, Prince Kohli was named as the new CEO.
