= Test management tool =

Stores test steps, test planning and reporting

Test management tools are used to store information on how testing is to be done, plan testing activities and report the status of quality assurance activities. The tools have different approaches to testing and thus have different sets of features. Generally they are used to maintain and plan manual testing, run or gather execution data from automated tests, manage multiple environments and to enter information about found defects. Test management tools offer the prospect of streamlining the testing process and allow quick access to data analysis, collaborative tools and easy communication across multiple project teams. Many test management tools incorporate requirements management capabilities to streamline test case design from the requirements. Tracking of defects and project tasks are done within one application to further simplify the testing.

== Structuring the test process ==
Test management tools give teams the ability to consolidate and structure the test process using one test management tool, instead of installing multiple applications that are designed to manage only one step of the process. Test management tools allow teams to manage test case environments, automated tests, defects and project tasks. Some applications include advanced dashboards and detailed tracking of key metrics, allowing for easy tracking of progress and bug management.

== Implementation ==
A test management tool that includes everything needed to manage the test process can save testers the problems of installing separate applications that are necessary for the testing process, which can also be time consuming. They can be implemented with minimal programming ability, allowing for easy installation and monitoring of the test process across multiple project groups. Once installed, teams have instant access to a user interface and can immediately start running and recording test cases. These types of applications are designed to simplify the test management process with high levels of automation and tracking built in, yet don't require advanced programming skills or knowledge to implement. They are useful for teams who manage a variety of test cases and for larger teams who need an all-inclusive application for project management.

== Using ==
Once a project has kicked off, a test management tool tracks bug status, defects and projects tasks, and allows for collaboration across the team. When administering test cases, users can access a variety of dashboards to gain access to data instantly, making the test process efficient and accurate. The type of dashboard used is determined by the scope of the project and the information and data that needs to be extracted during the testing process. Data can be shared and accessed across multiple project teams, allowing for effective communication and collaboration throughout the testing process.

== Open-source test management tools ==
The following table lists notable open-source tools used for test management, test execution, test automation management, and related quality assurance activities.

Tool	License	Platform	GitHub Stars	Key Features
Keploy	Apache 2.0	Cloud, Self-hosted	17.6k+	Test management, API testing, automated test generation, test data management, mock/stub generation
Kiwi TCMS	GPL-2.0	Web-based	3.5k+	Test plans, test cases, execution tracking, reporting
TestLink	GPL-2.0	Web-based	800+	Test case management, requirements traceability, reporting
Squash TM	LGPL-3.0	Web-based	500+	Requirements management, BDD support, test execution
Testopia	MPL-1.1	Web-based	200+	Test case management, test runs, defect tracking

== See also ==
- Test management
- Software testing
- Test automation management tools
