= Wet Hollow =

Valley in the U.S. state of Missouri

Coordinates: 36.623950°N 91.627643°W

Wet Hollow is a valley in Oregon County in the U.S. state of Missouri.

Wet Hollow was named for the fact the area is often wet.
