= The Get Wets =

the Get Wets
- Origin: Columbia, South Carolina, United States
- Genres: Rhythm and blues, Rock and roll
- Years active: 2006 - present

the Get Wets are a rhythm and blues band, originally from Columbia, South Carolina, with a 1960s garage rock and surf rock influence. The band was formed in 2006 by Mike Lee as a lark but evolved into a popular party band performing around South Carolina.

== History ==
=== Early history ===
There have been several lineups, with Lee being the only constant member. One original song, "Beat Beat", was recorded in 2010 and appeared on the 2012 compilation, We Love Trash: the Best of the GaragePunk Hideout, volume 7.

=== Radio ===
The group performed live on two occasions on local music show the Columbia Beet airing on WUSC-FM. The song "Beat Beat" has also been heard on WXRY Unsigned, a show that airs independent bands from South Carolina.

=== Band ===
Mike Lee — lead vocals, tambourine (2006–present)

Joel Floyd — drums, backing vocals (2009–2012)

Jay Pou — bass, backing vocals (2009–2012)

Logan Goldstein — organ, backing vocals (2010–2012)

Rev. Joe Roberts — baritone saxophone (2012–2013)

Byron Chitty — baritone guitar, backing vocals (2012–2013)

Scotty Tempo — drums, backing vocals (2012–2013)

== Discography ==
=== Compilations ===
- We Love Trash: the Best of the GaragePunk Hideout, volume 7 – GRGPNK Records (2012)
1. "Beat Beat"
