= Watir =

Open-source family of Ruby libraries

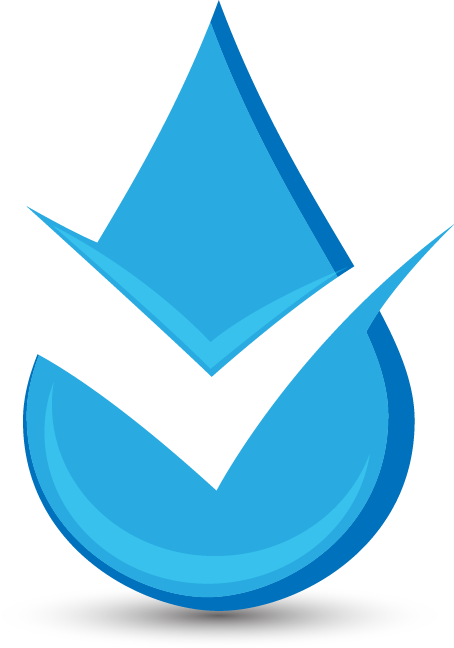
- Developers: Bret Pettichord, Charley Baker, Angrez Singh, Jari Bakken, Jarmo Pertman, Hugh McGowan, Andreas Tolf Tolfsen, Paul Rogers, Dave Hoover, Sai Venkatakrishnan, Tom Copeland, Alex Rodionov, Titus Fortner
- Stable release: 7.3 / August 4, 2023; 3 years ago
- Written in: Ruby
- Operating system: Cross-platform
- Type: Software testing framework for web applications
- License: MIT license
- Website: watir.com

Watir (Web Application Testing in Ruby, pronounced water), is an open-source family of Ruby libraries for automating web browsers. It drives Internet Explorer, Firefox, Chrome, Opera and Safari, and is available as a RubyGems gem. Watir was primarily developed by Bret Pettichord and Paul Rogers.

== Functionality ==
Watir project consists of several smaller projects. The most important ones are watir-classic, watir-webdriver and watirspec.

=== Watir-Classic ===
Watir-Classic makes use of the fact that Ruby has built-in Object Linking and Embedding (OLE) capabilities. As such it is possible to drive Internet Explorer programmatically. Watir-Classic operates differently to HTTP-based test tools, which operate by simulating a browser. Instead, Watir-classic directly drives the browser through the OLE protocol, which is implemented over the Component Object Model (COM) architecture.

The COM permits interprocess communication (such as between Ruby and Internet Explorer) and dynamic object creation and manipulation (which is what the Ruby program does to the Internet Explorer). Microsoft calls this "OLE automation", and calls the manipulating program an "automation controller". Technically, the Internet Explorer process is the server and serves the automation objects, exposing their methods; while the Ruby program then becomes the client which manipulates the automation objects.

=== Watir-Webdriver ===
Watir-Webdriver is a modern version of the Watir API based on Selenium. Selenium 2.0 (Selenium-Webdriver) aims to be the reference implementation of the WebDriver specification. In Ruby, Jari Bakken has implemented the Watir API as a wrapper around the Selenium 2.0 API. Not only is Watir-Webdriver derived from Selenium 2.0, it is also built from the HTML specification, so Watir-Webdriver should always be compatible with existing W3C specifications.

=== Watirspec ===
Watirspec is executable specification of the Watir API, like RubySpec is for Ruby.

== See also ==
- Acceptance testing
- Regression testing
- List of web testing tools
- Test automation
