= Ranorex =

US information technology company

Ranorex Inc

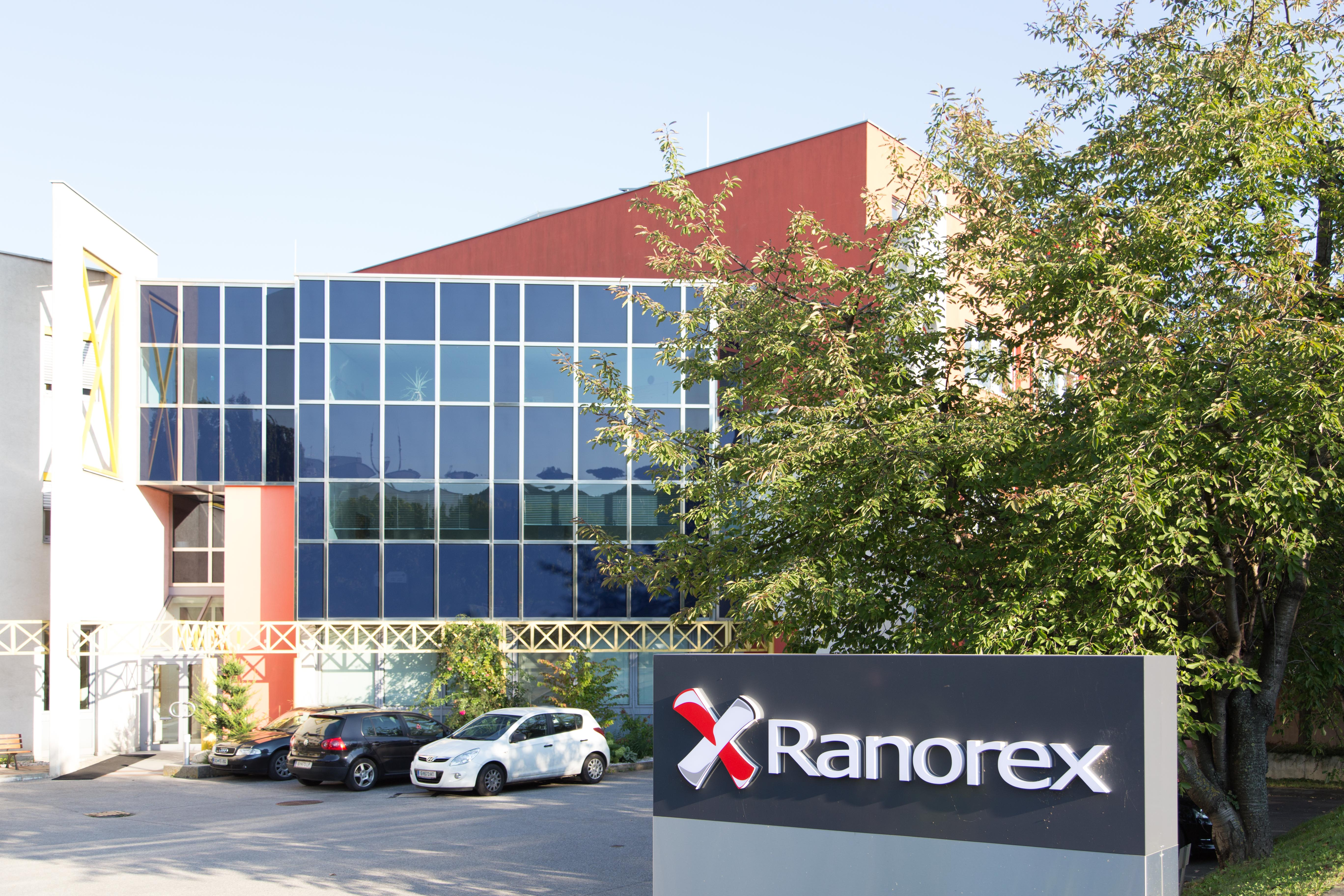
- Type: Inc
- Industry: Technology
- Founded: 2007
- Headquarters: Austin, Texas
- Products: Test automation software
- Website: ranorex.com

Ranorex Inc is a US information technology company that produces test automation software. Initially located in Graz, Austria, as of September 2021 the company headquarters was in Austin, Texas. Ranorex Studio is Ranorex Inc's flagship product.

== History ==
In 2004, Ranorex co-founder Jenö Herget was a programmer working on a software development team in Graz. The team wanted to automate the repetitive tasks inherent in software testing. Since Herget could find no suitable product on the market, he wrote his own testing tool. Convinced that there was a need for this type of product and assisted by his son Gabor Herget, Jenö Herget expanded the product and made it publicly available online for free in 2006 under the name "Ranorex". With assistance from EOSS Industries Holding GmbH, Jenö and Gabor Herget founded Ranorex in September 2007. At the time of the company founding, Ranorex was both the name of the company and of its flagship software testing product.

In January 2018 Ranorex was purchased by American software company Idera, Inc.
