= OpenJS Foundation =

American nonprofit organization

- Predecessor: jQuery Foundation; Dojo Foundation; JS Foundation; Node.js Foundation
- Formation: 2019; 7 years ago
- Type: 501(c)(6) organization
- Purpose: Promote JavaScript and related technologies
- Location: San Francisco, California
- Website: openjsf.org

The OpenJS Foundation is an organization that was founded in 2019 from a merger of JS Foundation and Node.js Foundation. OpenJS promotes the JavaScript and web communities by hosting projects and funding activities that benefit them. The OpenJS Foundation is made up of 38 open source JavaScript projects including Appium, Dojo, jQuery, Node.js, Node-RED and webpack. Founding members included Google, Microsoft, IBM, PayPal, GoDaddy, and Joyent.

OpenJS has received over 800,000 Euros from Germany's Sovereign Tech Fund.

== History ==
=== jQuery projects ===
Prior to the jQuery Foundation, the jQuery project had been a member of the Software Freedom Conservancy since 2009. Earlier that same year, jQuery published the Sizzle selector engine software as a spin-off from jQuery itself, and donated its copyright to the Dojo Foundation to encourage collaboration.

=== jQuery Foundation ===
jQuery Foundation was founded in 2012 as 501(c)(6) non-profit organization to support the development of the jQuery and jQuery UI projects. jQuery is the most widely adopted JavaScript library according to web analysis as of 2012.

The jQuery Foundation also advocates on behalf of web developers to improve web standards through its memberships in the W3C, and Ecma TC39 (JavaScript). It created a standards collaboration team in 2011 and joined the W3C in 2013.

In 2016, the Dojo Foundation which developed the Dojo Toolkit merged with jQuery Foundation and subsequently rebranded itself as JS Foundation and became a Linux Foundation project.

JS Foundation (legally JSFoundation, Inc) existed from 2016 to 2019, and aimed to help development and adoption of important JavaScript technology. The foundation worked to facilitate collaboration within the JavaScript development community to "foster JavaScript applications and server-side projects by providing best practices and policies."

=== Node.js Foundation ===
The Node.js Foundation was created in 2015 as a Linux Foundation project to accelerate the development of the Node.js platform. The Node.js Foundation operated under an open-governance model to heighten participation amongst vendors, developers, and the general Node.js community. Its structure gives enterprise users the assurance of "innovation and continuity without risk." Its growth led to new initiatives such as the Node Security Platform, a tool allowing continuous security monitoring for Node.js apps. And Node Interactive, "a series of professional conferences aimed at today's average Node.js user." Node.js reports "3.5 million users and an annual growth rate of 100 percent" and the Node.js Foundation is reported as being among The Linux Foundation's fastest growing projects.

In 2019, the Node.js Foundation merged with the JS Foundation to form the new OpenJS Foundation with a stated mission to foster healthy growth of the JavaScript and web ecosystem as a whole.

== Projects ==
- The Dojo Foundation (prior to 2016) was most notably home to the Dojo web framework. It was also host to Lodash, RequireJS, and other projects created by the Dojo community.
- The jQuery Foundation (2012–2016), was host to the original jQuery projects such as jQuery, jQuery UI, Sizzle and QUnit. In 2015 the Grunt project joined and Globalize was launched. In 2016, the ESLint project joined.
- The JS Foundation (2016–2019) attracted additional projects. In 2016, Appium joined, and Node-RED was contributed by IBM in 2016.
