= Thoughtworks =

American software company

Thoughtworks Holding, Inc.
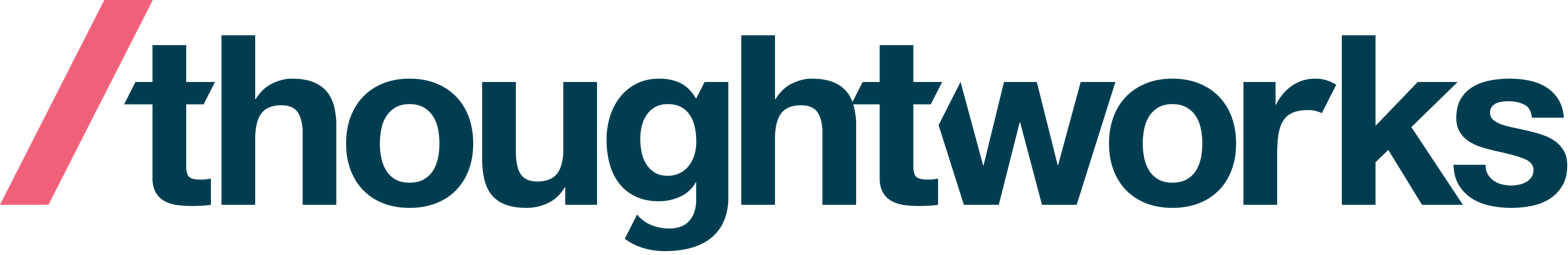
- Type: Private
- Industry: Software industry
- Founded: 1993; 33 years ago
- Founder: Neville Roy Singham
- Headquarters: Chicago, Illinois, U.S.
- Number of locations: 49
- Key people: Mike Sutcliff (CEO); Martin Fowler
- Services: AI first software delivery
- Number of employees: 10,000
- Website: thoughtworks.com

Thoughtworks Holding, Inc. is a privately held, global technology company with 49 offices in 18 countries. It provides software design and delivery, and tools and consulting services. The company's Chief Scientist co-authored the Agile Manifesto and is closely associated with the movement for Agile software development, and has contributed to open source products. Thoughtworks' business includes enterprise platforms modernization and AI first software delivery.

== History ==
=== 1980s–1990s ===
In the late 1980s, Roy Singham founded Singham Business Services as a management consulting company servicing the equipment leasing industry in a Chicago basement. According to Singham, after two-to-three years, Singham started recruiting additional staff and came up with the name Thoughtworks in 1990. The company was incorporated under the new name in 1993 and focused on building software applications. Over time, Thoughtworks' technology shifted from C++ and Forte 4GL in the mid-1990s to include Java in the late 1990s.

=== 1990s–2010s ===
Martin Fowler joined the company in 1999 and became its chief scientist in 2000.

In 2001, Thoughtworks agreed to settle a lawsuit by Microsoft for $480,000 for deploying unlicensed copies of office productivity software to employees.

Also in 2001, Fowler, Jim Highsmith, and other key software figures authored the Agile Manifesto. The company began using agile techniques while working on a leasing project. Thoughtworks' technical expertise expanded with the .NET Framework in 2002, C# in 2004, Ruby and the Rails platform in 2006. In 2002, Thoughtworks chief scientist Martin Fowler wrote "Patterns of Enterprise Application Architecture" with contributions by ThoughtWorkers David Rice and Matthew Foemmel, as well as outside contributors Edward Hieatt, Robert Mee, and Randy Stafford.

Thoughtworks Studios was launched as its product division in 2006 and shut down in 2020. The division created, supported and sold agile project management and software development and deployment tools including Mingle, Gauge (formerly Twist), Snap CI and GoCD.

On 2 March 2007, Thoughtworks announced Trevor Mather as the new CEO. Singham became Executive chairman. Also in March 2007, Rebecca Parsons assumed the role of Chief Technical Officer, having been with the company since 1999.

By 2008, Thoughtworks employed 1,000 people and was growing at the rate of 20–30% p.a., with bases around the world. Its clients included Microsoft, Oracle, major banks, and The Guardian newspaper. Singham owned 97% of the common stock of the company. By 2010, its clients included Daimler AG, Siemens and Barclays, and had opened a second headquarters in Bangalore.

In 2010, Singham opened Thoughtworks’ Fifth Agile Software Development Conference in Beijing.

=== 2010s–2020s ===
In 2010, Jim Highsmith joined Thoughtworks.

In April 2013, Thoughtworks announced a collective leadership structure and appointed four co-Presidents of the global organization. The appointments followed the announcement that the then current CEO, Trevor Mather, was leaving Thoughtworks to take up the role of CEO for the used car sales business Trader Media Group.

In May 2013, David Walton was hired as Director of Global Health. Walton has done work in Haiti since 1999, including helping establish a 300-room, solar-powered hospital and the establishment of a noncommunicable disease clinic.

In 2015, Guo Xiao, who started as a developer in Thoughtworks China in 1999, became the chief executive officer and President. Also in 2015, Chinese marketing data company AdMaster acquired Chinese online form automation platform JinShuJu from Thoughtworks.

In early 2016, Thoughtworks closed their Toronto offices, the last remaining Canadian office after the closure of their Calgary offices in 2013. They have since reopened the Toronto office.

Singham sold the company to British private equity firm Apax Partners in 2017 for $785 million, by which time it had 4,500 employees across 15 countries, including South Africa. Singham left the company.

After 2017, several members of Thoughtworks senior staff began to work for the People's Support Foundation, founded by Singham's partner Jodie Evans with the support of Chad Wathington, Thoughtworks' chief strategy officer, and Jason Pfetcher, Thoughtworks' former general counsel.

=== 2020s–Present ===
Thoughtworks announced that it acquired Gemini Solutions Inc. in January 2021. Gemini is a privately held software development consulting services firm, and it is based in Romania. At the end of January 2021, Thoughtworks raised $720 million in funding according to data compiled by Chicago Inno. The following month, Thoughtworks acquired Fourkind, a machine learning and data science consulting company based in Finland. In March 2021, Thoughtworks worked with the Veterans Affairs Department to deploy a centralized mechanism for delivering updates via 'VANotify'.

On September 15, 2021, Thoughtworks IPO'd on the NASDAQ and is listed as $TWKS.

In April 2022, Thoughtworks acquired Connected, a product development company based in Canada.

In May 2024, Guo Xiao stepped down as CEO of Thoughtworks, with the transition becoming official in June 2024. He is succeeded by Mike Sutcliff.

In November 2024, Thoughtworks was taken private by Apax Partners for $4.40 per share.

== Notable employees ==
- Aaron Swartz
- Jim Highsmith
- Martin Fowler
- Ola Bini
- Zack Exley
- Zhamak Dehghani

== See also ==
- Software industry in Telangana
