= Modularity-driven testing =

Software testing technique

Modularity-driven testing is a term used in the testing of software. The test script modularity framework requires the creation of small, independent scripts that represent modules, sections, and functions of the application-under-test. These small scripts are then used in a hierarchical fashion to construct larger tests, realizing a particular test case.

== Background ==
Of all the frameworks, this one should be the simplest to grasp and master. It is a well-known programming strategy to build an abstraction layer in front of a component to hide the component from the rest of the application. This insulates the application from modifications in the component and provides modularity in the application design. The test script modularity framework applies this principle of abstraction or encapsulation in order to improve the maintainability and scalability of automated test suites.
