= Visual Test =

- Developers: Microsoft, Rational Software
- Initial release: 1992; 34 years ago
- Operating system: Windows
- Available in: English
- License: Proprietary

Visual Test, originally known as MS-Test, was an automated testing tool for Windows applications developed by Microsoft and later sold to Rational Software.

== Overview ==
MS-Test was developed for internal use in Microsoft but became a commercial product at the beginning of 1992. MS-Test automated the process of testing Windows applications. It combined a Windows development language, Basic, with a testing-oriented API.

Tests known as scripts were written in Test Basic, a form of the BASIC programming language. The API was predominantly wrapped around Windows API functions. Test scripts could be created with capture/replay, in particular by the Windows Recorder tool. However its dominant strength was that scripts could be coded and compiled. Either an individual script could be run, or a group of them run in sequence by a test driver. Among the innovations for the test driver was the ability to customize the batch execution with the inclusion of custom-designed dialog boxes and menus, which were built with the User Interface Editor.

Customers had to purchase Visual Test to develop scripts, but it offered free and unlimited redistribution of compiled scripts. The ability to use OLE Automation allowed enterprising individuals to expand beyond basic functional testing into load testing. A script could create tens of browsers, drive them, feed them with data, collect statistics and monitor the state of the test.

== Capabilities ==
New capabilities were added over time. In 1992, new DLLs were added to provide support for testing:

1. DOS VM
2. Dynamic Data Exchange (DDE)
3. The ability to run scripts remotely on other PCs of a local LAN
4. An enhanced test driver

Included with Visual Test was a suite of samples that demonstrated the range of capabilities of the product.

1. Play the Minesweeper game on its own.
2. Play Solitaire
3. Sample screen saver and others

=== 32-bit enhancements ===
Version 2.0 in 1993 had provided support for Windows 3.1. In 1994 MS-Test version 3.0 advanced from 16-bit systems to 32-bit. With Version 4.0 in 1995, it was hosted within Visual Studio and renamed to Visual Test. It was able to support the testing of the new application control that arrived with Windows 95 and NT. The other development language, Visual Basic, remained hosted within its own separate development environment. With its inclusion in Visual Studio, versioning of scripts could be maintained with Microsoft Visual SourceSafe, also part of Studio. In version 4.0, the ability to access its capabilities from Visual Basic and C++, lost with 3.0, was regained.

As 4.0r was being released, Rational Software Corporation negotiated its purchase from Microsoft in 1996. Version 6 (5 was skipped) from Rational incorporated support Microsoft Active Accessibility (MSAA), support for HTML and Web pages and ability to read and change the Windows Registry. Version 6 provided support for Windows 98 and NT 5.0, which eventually became Windows 2000.

Mainsoft Corporation created a ported version called MainWin Visual Test 4.0r for Unix. This version is for testing Unix applications created from Windows applications using Mainsoft MainWin platform.

Rational Visual Test 6 was also sold as part of Rational DevelopmentStudio bundle. Visual Test was integrated with other Rational products: Purify, and Quantify, PureCoverage and ClearCase. Rational remained committed to fully support Visual Test through 2002. The last version shipped was 6.5.

As of 2006, 103 tech notes that were provided as part of the support from Rational remained available from IBM, which previously acquired Rational (Search results).
