= Web testing =

Software testing that focuses on web applications

Web testing is software testing that focuses on web applications. Complete testing of a web-based system before going live can help address issues before the system is revealed to the public. Issues may include the security of the web application, the basic functionality of the site, its accessibility to disabled and fully able users, its ability to adapt to the multitude of desktops, devices, and operating systems, as well as readiness for expected traffic and number of users and the ability to survive a massive spike in user traffic, both of which are related to load testing.

== Web application performance tool ==
A web application performance tool (WAPT) is used to test web applications and web related interfaces. These tools are used for performance, load and stress testing of web applications, web sites, web API, web servers and other web interfaces. WAPT tends to simulate virtual users which will repeat either recorded URLs or specified URL and allows the users to specify number of times or iterations that the virtual users will have to repeat the recorded URLs. By doing so, the tool is useful to check for bottleneck and performance leakage in the website or web application being tested.

A WAPT faces various challenges during testing and should be able to conduct tests for:

- Browser compatibility
- Operating System compatibility
- Windows application compatibility where required

WAPT allows a user to specify how virtual users are involved in the testing environment.ie either increasing users or constant users or periodic users load. Increasing user load, step by step is called RAMP where virtual users are increased from 0 to hundreds. Constant user load maintains specified user load at all time. Periodic user load tends to increase and decrease the user load from time to time.

== Web security testing ==
Web security testing tells us whether Web-based applications requirements are met when they are subjected to malicious input data. There is a web application security testing plug-in collection for Fire Fox

== Web API testing ==
An application programming interface API exposes services to other software components, which can query the API. The API implementation is in charge of computing the service and returning the result to the component that send the query. A part of web testing focuses on testing these web API implementations.

GraphQL is a specific query and API language. It is the focus of tailored testing techniques. Search-based test generation yields good results to generate test cases for GraphQL APIs.

== See also ==
- List of web testing tools
- Software performance testing
- Software testing
- Web server benchmarking
