= Earl (surname) =

Earl is a surname, and may refer to:

- Acie Earl (born 1970), American basketball player
- Andy Earl (disambiguation), multiple people
- Arester Earl (1892–1988), African-American quilter
- Belinda Earl (born 1961), British businesswoman
- Brian Earl (born 1976), American basketball player and coach
- Edwin T. Earl (1858–1919), American journalist
- George Earl (disambiguation), multiple people
- Glenn Earl (born 1981), American football player
- Harley Earl (1893–1969), American designer
- Holly Earl (born 1992), English actress
- James Earl (1835–1905), Australian merchant, cartage and cattle breeder
- Jane Earl, British politician
- Jessie Earl (died 1980), English female murder victim
- Jimmy Earl (born 1957), American jazz musician
- Josh Earl (disambiguation), several people
- Justin Townes Earle (1982–2020), American musician
- Kate Earl (born 1981), American singer-songwriter
- Ken Earl (1925–1986), English cricketer
- Maud Earl (1864–1943), English/American dog painter
- Michael Earl (disambiguation), several people
- Millie Earl, British politician
- Oren R. Earl (1813–1901), New York assemblyman
- Ralph Earl (1751–1801), American painter
- Robert Earl (disambiguation), several people
- Roger Earl (born 1946), English drummer
- Ronnie Earl (born 1953), musical artist
- Russell Earl, special effects artist
- Sam Earl (1915–2000), English professional footballer
- Shelby Earl (born 1976), American singer-songwriter
- Stacy Earl (born 1963), American singer
- Tony Earl (1936–2023), American politician

== See also ==
- Board of Education v. Earls
- Ear (disambiguation)
- Earl
- Earle (disambiguation)
- Earll
- Early (disambiguation)
- Earp (disambiguation)
- Erl (disambiguation)
- Erle (disambiguation)
- Pearl (surname)
- Searle (disambiguation)
