= Earle (surname) =

Earle is a surname, pronounced 'erl'. Notable people with the surname include:

- Alfred Earle (1907–1990), British air marshal
- Alice Morse Earle (1851–1911), American historian
- Beverly M. Earle (born 1943), American politician
- William Moffat "Billy" Earle (1867–1946), American baseball player
- Bruce Herbelin-Earle, English-French actor and model
- Clifford John Earle Jr. (1935–2017), American mathematician
- Edward Mead Earle (1894–1954), author, academic and military strategy specialist
- Elias Earle (1762–1822), American politician
- Eyvind Earle (1916–2000), American artist
- Felix Earle, Native American artist
- Franklin Sumner Earle (1856–1929), biologist
- Genevieve Earle (1885–1956), American politician
- George Howard Earle III (1890–1974), American politician
- George Howard Earle Jr. (1856–1928), American lawyer and businessman
- Giles Earle (disambiguation), several people
- Gordon Earle (born 1943), Canadian politician
- Guy Earle (1891–1966), English cricketer
- Hobart Earle (born 1960), Ukrainian conductor
- Horatio Earle (1855–1935), American roads advocate
- Jack Earle (1906–1952), acromegalic American actor
- Sir James Earle (1755–1817), eighteenth-century British surgeon, renowned for his skill in lithotomy
- John Earle (disambiguation), several people
- Joseph H. Earle (1847–1897), American politician
- Josephine Earle (1892–1929), American actress
- Julia Salter Earle (1878–1945), Newfoundland suffragist and labour leader
- Justin Townes Earle (1982–2020), American singer-songwriter and musician
- Mary Earle (1929–2021), New Zealand food technologist
- Mary Tracy Earle (1864–1955), American author
- Merie Earle (1889–1984), American actress
- Mortimer Lamson Earle (1864–1905), American classical scholar
- Nathan Earle (disambiguation), several people
- Ralph Earle (disambiguation), several people
- Robbie Earle (born 1965), British footballer
- Ronnie Earle (1942–2020), American lawyer and politician
- Sarah H. Earle (1799–1858), American Quaker, abolitionist, and women's rights activist
- Stacey Earle (born 1960), American musician and sister of Steve Earle
- Steve Earle (born 1955), American musician and brother of Stacy Earle
- Sylvia Earle (born 1935), American oceanographer
- Thomas Earle (1796–1849), American lawyer
- William A. Earle (1919–1988), American philosopher
- Wilton R. Earle (1902–1964), American cell biologist
- Windom Earle, fictional character from Twin Peaks

== Earle family of New England ==
- Ralph Earle (settler)
- Ralph Earle (captain)
  - Ralph Earl (artist)
    - Augustus Earle
    - Ralph Eleaser Whiteside Earl
  - James Earle (painter)
- Pliny Earle I (inventor)
  - Pliny Earle (physician)
  - John Milton Earle
  - Thomas Earle
    - George Howard Earle Sr.
      - Florence Van Leer Earle Coates
      - George Howard Earle Jr.
        - George Howard Earle III
          - Ralph Earle II

== See also ==
- Earl (surname)
- Earle (disambiguation)
- Earl
- List of Old English (Anglo-Saxon) surnames
