= Earl (disambiguation) =

Earl is a title of nobility in Britain.

Earl may also refer to:

== Places ==
- Earl, Colorado
- Earl, Missouri
- Earl, North Carolina
- Earl, Wisconsin
- Edinburgh Airport Rail Link (EARL)

== People ==
- Earl (given name)
- Earl (surname)
- Earl (singer), American singer-songwriter

== Entertainment ==
- Earl, a fictional planet in My-Otome
- Earl, nickname of a car on MythBusters
- Earl Schmerle, an animatronic puppet used by Rolfe DeWolfe, in The Rock-afire Explosion music show
- Earl (mixtape), a mixtape by Earl Sweatshirt
- Earl (Mushvenom album)

== Other uses ==
- Jarl, a Scandinavian title of nobility
- Earl (automobile), an automobile manufactured by Earl Motors Incorporated
- Earls (restaurant chain)
- The EARL, music venue in Atlanta, United States

== See also ==
- Earl Township (disambiguation)
- Eorl (disambiguation)
- Hurricane Earl (disambiguation)
- Jarl (disambiguation)
