= Erle =

Erle may refer to:

== Places ==
- Erle, Astrakhan Oblast, Russia
- Erle, California, a former settlement in the United States
- Erle (river), a river of Thuringia, Germany
- Erle, Gelsenkirchen, a borough of the German city of Gelsenkirchen
- Erle, Raesfeld, a village in the German municipality of Raesfeld

== Given name ==
- Erle Bartley (1922–1983), American agricultural scientist
- Erle C. Ellis, American scientist
- Erle Elsworth Clippinger (1864–1933), writer of children's literature, educator, and a grammaticist
- Erle Cocke Jr. (1921–2000), American businessman
- Erle Cox (1873–1950), Australian journalist and science fiction writer
- Erle Stanley Gardner (1889–1970), American lawyer and author of detective stories
- Erle P. Halliburton (1892–1957), American businessman
- Erle Harstad (born 1990), Norwegian figure skater
- Erle Johnston (1917–1995), American public official, newspaperman, author, and mayor
- Erle C. Kenton (1896–1980), American film director
- Erle V. Painter (1881–1968), American chiropractor and athletic trainer
- Erle Reiter (1916–2008), American figure skater
- Erle Whiting (1876–1958), fifth president of The Church of Jesus Christ
- Erle Wiltshire (born 1973), former flyweight boxer from Australia

== Surname ==
- Broadus Erle (1918–1977), American violinist
- Christopher Erle (1590–1634), English lawyer and politician
- Everett C. Erle (1906–1990), of Oakland, California
- Peter Erle (1795–1877), English lawyer
- Schuyler Erle, free software developer and activist
- Thomas Erle (c. 1680–1720), Lieutenant-General of the Ordnance
- Walter Erle (1586–1665), English landowner and politician
- Sir William Erle (1793–1880), English lawyer, judge and Whig politician

== See also ==
- Erl (disambiguation)
- Earle (disambiguation)
