= EARS =

EARS may refer to:

== Places ==
- Gate of the Ears, a gate in the city of Granada (Andalusia, Spain)
- East African Rift System

== Brands, enterprises, and organizations ==
- EARS (software) or Election Agents Record System, software which is used in connection with elections
- Electronic Arts, Redwood Shores, the headquarters of video game company Electronic Arts
- Emirates Amateur Radio Society, a national non-profit organization for amateur radio enthusiasts in the United Arab Emirates
- Ultimate Ears, an American custom in-ear monitor (IEM), speaker, and earphone manufacturer

== Biology ==
- Auricularia auricula-judae, a fungus also known as "Jew's Ears" or "Judas's Ear"
- Venus's ears, gastropod molluscs in the family Haliotidae, also known as abalone, ear shells, or sea ears;

== Computing ==
- Easy Approach to Requirements Syntax, a structured method for writing natural language requirements

== See also ==
- Bunny ears (disambiguation)
- Ear (disambiguation)
- Ears, multiple form for the sense organ that detects sound
- Lend Me Your Ears (disambiguation)
- Rabbit Ears (disambiguation)
