= James Earl (disambiguation) =

James Earl (1761–1796) was an American painter.

James Earl or James Earle may also refer to:

- James Earl (grazier) (1835–1905), Australian pastoralist and merchant
- Jim Earl, American cartoonist and comedian
- Jimmy Earl (born 1957), American jazz musician
- James Earle (1755–1817), British surgeon

== See also ==
- James Earl Carter Jr. or Jimmy Carter (1924–2024), 39th president of the United States from 1977 to 1981
- James Earl Carter Sr. (1894–1953), American politician and father of Jimmy Carter
- James Earl Jones (1931–2024), American actor
- James Earl Ray (1928–1998), convicted assassin of Martin Luther King Jr.
- Earl (surname)
- Earle (surname)
