= Community Banana Stand =

Fruit stand operated by amazon.com

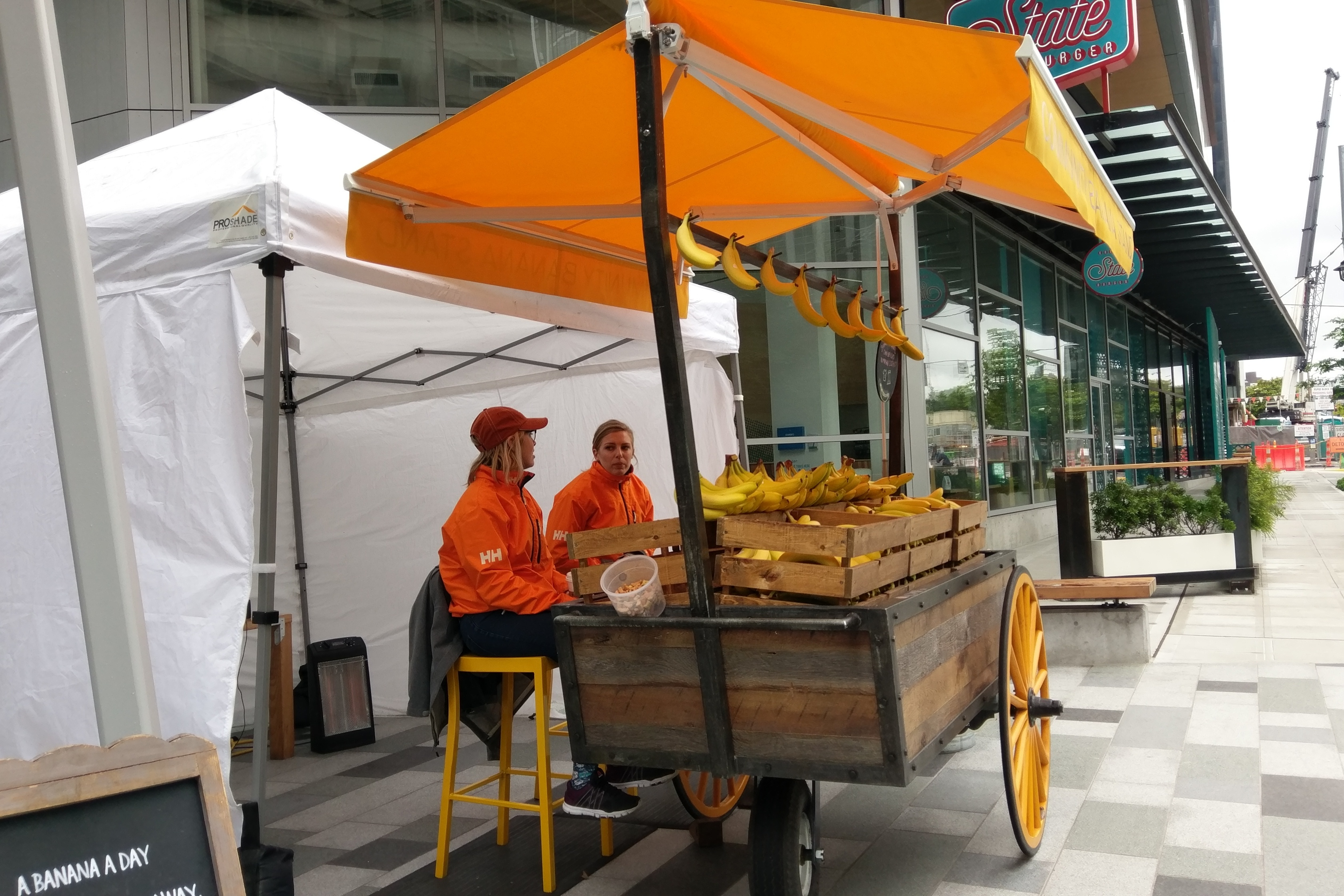
A Community Banana Stand in downtown Seattle, staffed by two "banistas"

A Community Banana Stand is a fruit stand operated by the American company Amazon around its Seattle headquarters and Arlington headquarters, offering free bananas to passersby. Originally proposed by then-CEO Jeff Bezos, the first Community Banana Stand opened in South Lake Union in December 2015.

== Operation ==
The stands are open weekdays from 8 a.m. to 3:30 pm, providing bananas to employees and non-employees alike. Stand attendants, known as "banistas", oversee the distribution of around 8,000 bananas per day at its two wooden carts, supervised by so-called "bananagers" who keep track of demand. Banistas sometimes offer up trivia facts about bananas, such as the proper term for a bunch of bananas (a hand). Having previously considered oranges and apples, Amazon decided to go with bananas as they require no washing or extra packaging, with each stand providing a compost bin for peels. Visitors have requested a greater variety of fruit, but Amazon has demurred due to the high cost of other fruits.

Community feedback has been mixed. Most employees have a favorable view of the stands, though some have complained that it is difficult to find bananas for purchase at nearby grocery stores. A local vegetarian café, which offers sliced banana as a yogurt topping for $1, has seen demand for the topping plummet. Canadian chain restaurant Local Public Eatery has complained about the manners of certain customers at its Seattle location, who often bring in bananas to eat and leave behind the peels. Some have viewed the initiative as an attempt by Amazon to clean up its image after criticism of the company's culture and relative lack of employee perks compared to other tech companies.

The Seattle stands were closed in March 2020 during the onset of the COVID-19 pandemic after Amazon adopted remote work for its headquarters employees. They reopened the following year after employees were allowed to return to the headquarters campus.

Outside of Seattle, Amazon opened a temporary banana stand for the duration of CES 2019 in Las Vegas, in the midst of making several major product announcements at the trade show. In early 2022, Amazon opened a second Community Banana Stand in Arlington, Virginia at its HQ2 location.
