= ERL =

Erl or ERL may refer to:

== People ==
- Elli Erl (born 1979), German musician
- Hans Erl (1882–1942?), German operatic bass
- Sebastian Erl, German singer
- Thomas Erl (born 1967), Canadian author

== Transport ==
- ERL (automobile manufacturer), a defunct Swedish automobile manufacturer
- Eastern Region MRT line, in Singapore
- Erenhot Saiwusu International Airport, in China
- Express Rail Link, in Kuala Lumpur, Malaysia
- Euralair, a defunct French airline

== Other uses ==
- Erl, a municipality in Tyrol, Austria
- Eastern Refinery Limited, a state-owned oil refinery in Bangladesh
- Eastern Regional Libraries, in Victoria, Australia
- Effects range low
- Energy recovery linac
- Engineering Research Laboratories, a national laboratory of Pakistan
- Environmental Research Letters, an open-access peer-reviewed journal
- Erlang (programming language)
- Estonian Patriotic Movement (Estonian: Eesti Rahvuslik Liikumine), a defunct Estonian political pressure group
- European Rugby League, confederation for rugby league in Europe, North and Central America, the Middle East and Africa
- People's Union of Estonia (Estonian: Eestimaa Rahvaliit), a defunct political party of Estonia
- VW Electronics Research Laboratory, a division of Volkswagen

== See also ==
- Erle (disambiguation)
