= Jarl (disambiguation) =

Jarl is a noble title in Scandinavian countries.

Jarl or JARL may also refer to:

- Jarl (name), a list of people named Jarl
- Jarl, a son of the god Ríg in the poem Rígsþula
- Jarl, a catchphrase used by Spanish stand-up comedian Chiquito de la Calzada
- Japan Amateur Radio League (JARL)

== See also ==
- Earl, rank of the nobility in the United Kingdom
- Earl (disambiguation)
