= Earles =

Earles may refer to:

- Earles, Kentucky
- Betty Earles, a boat built in 1913

== People with the name Earles ==
- H. Clay Earles (1913-1999), American NASCAR promoter
- Jason Earles (born 1977), American actor
- Pat Earles (born 1955), English footballer

== See also ==
- Earl (disambiguation)
- Earle (disambiguation)
- Earle's Shipbuilding
