= Earl (automobile) =

Automobile manufactured by Earl Motors Incorporated

Earl Motors Incorporated
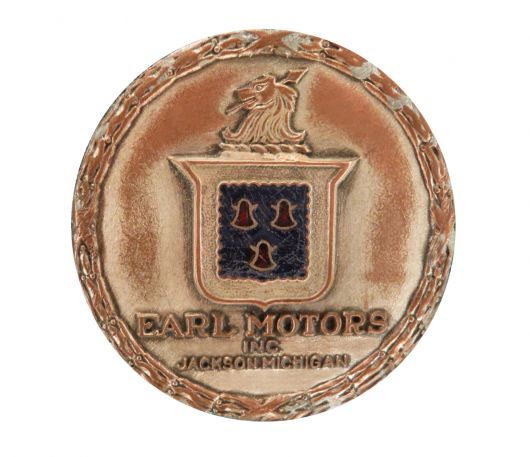
- Earl motors emblem
- Trade name: Earl Motors Incorporated
- Company type: Corporation
- Industry: Automotive
- Predecessor: Briscoe
- Founded: 1921
- Founder: Clarence A. Earl
- Defunct: 1923
- Headquarters: United States
- Products: Automobiles, collectables
- Production output: 2000 automobiles

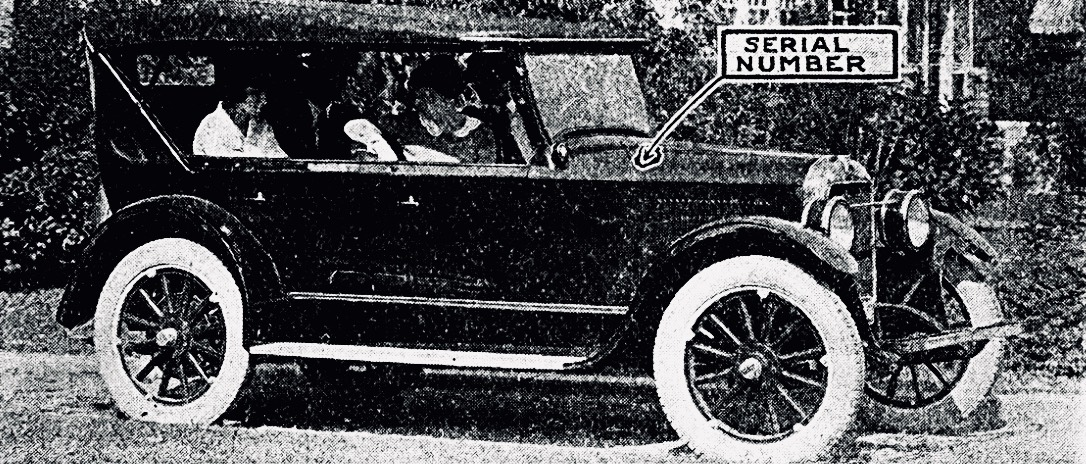
Earl 40 (1921-1923)

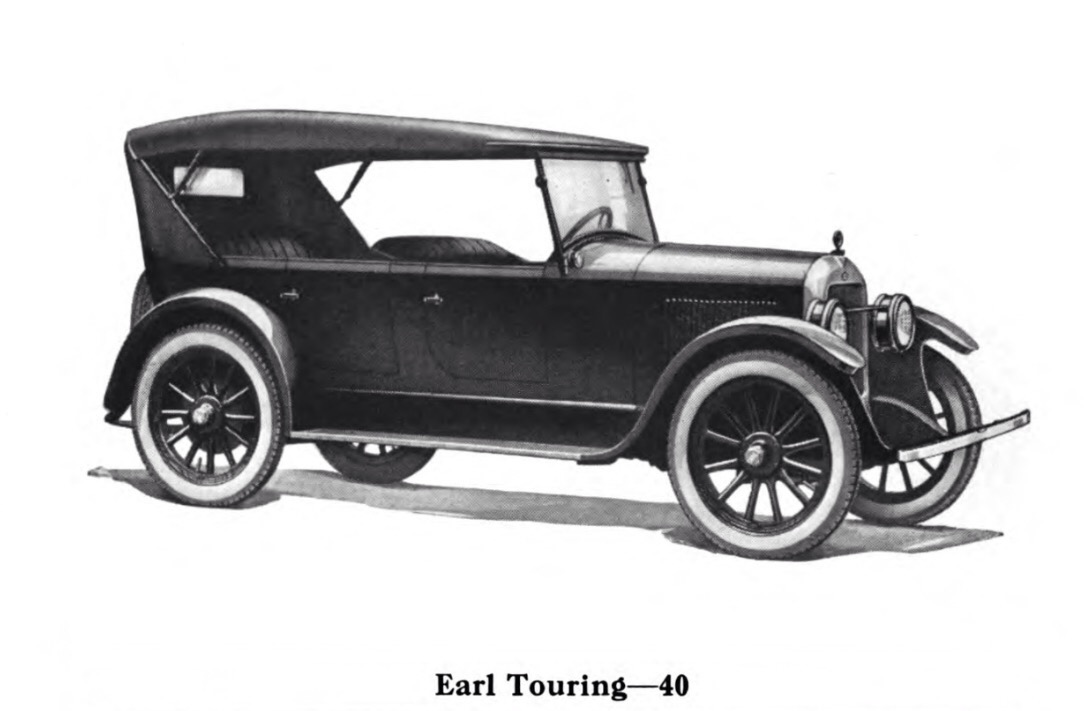
Earl 40 Touring

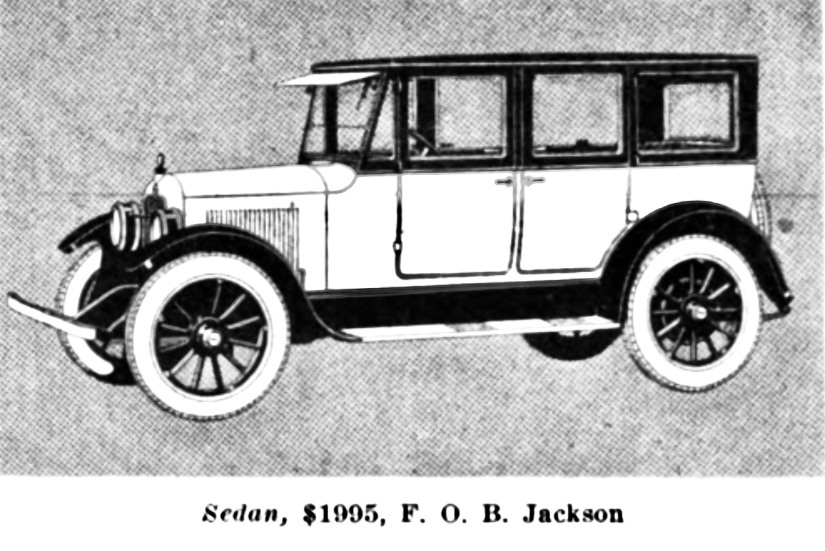
Earl 40 Sedan

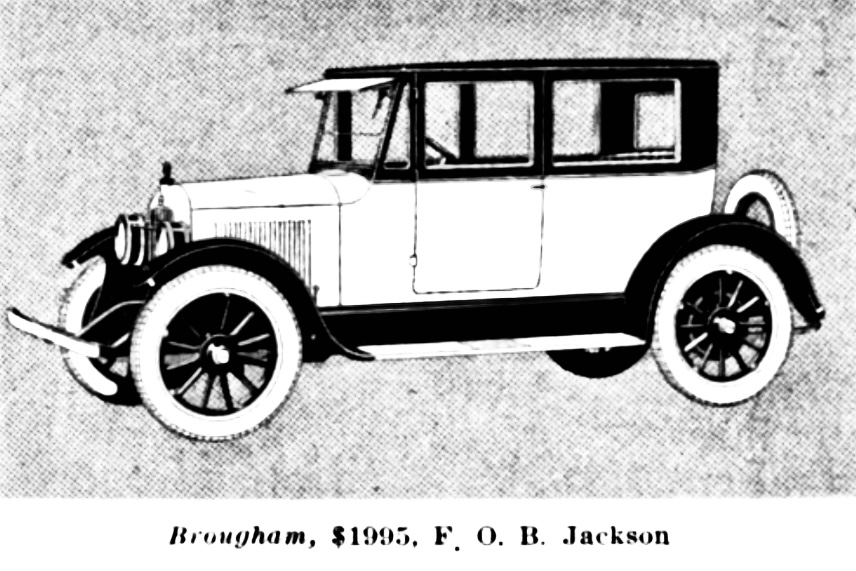
Earl 40 Brougham

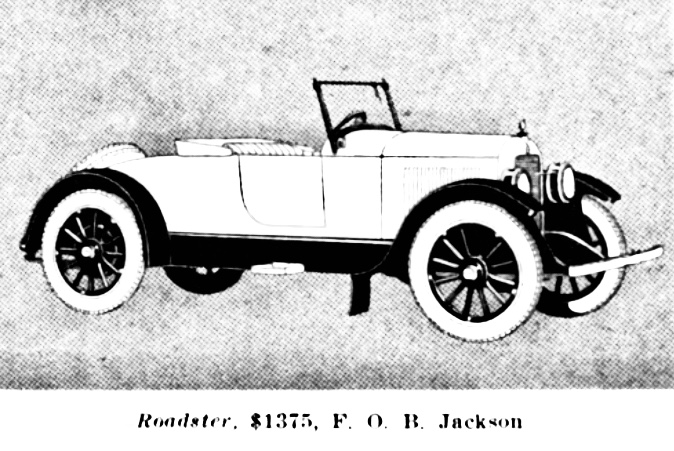
Earl 40 Roadster

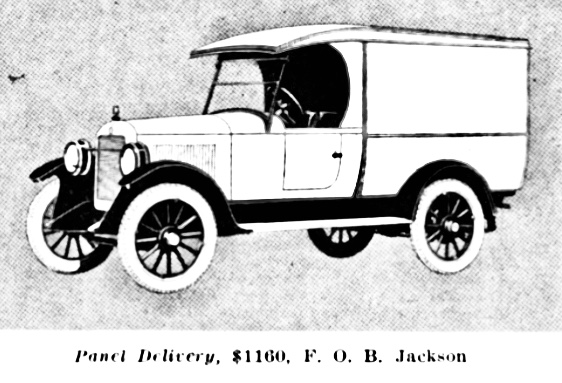
Earl 40 Delivery Van

The Earl was an automobile manufactured in Jackson, Michigan by Earl Motors Incorporated from 1921 to 1923. The Earl was a continuation of the Briscoe. The Model 40 offered both open and closed models with a four-cylinder engine. Approximately 2,000 vehicles were produced. When the Earl debuted in 1921, the tourer cost just $1285. The company also claimed that $100 worth of "extras", such as linoleum floor boards and carpets front and rear were included in the base price.

Benjamin Briscoe appointed Clarence A. Earl as president of Briscoe Motor Corporation in March 1921. Earl had previously been vice-president of Willys-Overland. Briscoe suddenly left in October of the same year, tired of all the misfortune he had suffered in the automotive field to date. He left his car and company to Earl. Earl then announced to the press that he would be forming Earl Motors and bringing out a new four-cylinder car. The four-cylinder engine had 3194 cc with a bore of 87.3125 mm and a stroke of 133.35 mm. The engine produced 37.5 hp. This was really just the Briscoe car with small modifications to solve some of its problems, as well as being slightly larger and more powerful.

Earl assumed many problems with the company, not least of which was one and a half million dollars of debt. However, he easily raised more capital from bankers. On the Earl Motors board were several bankers, as well as executives from various supplier firms. Among the latter was George C. Scobie, who had been with Price-Waterhouse and Hayes Wheel Company, and was now vice-president of the new organization. Earl developed disagreements with all these board members over the future path of his company, and resigned in November 1922. He then became president of National. Earl had wanted to become a high-volume producer, while the rest of the board preferred a lower-volume, more fiscally conservative approach.

The bankers and supplier executives now took over the company, with George Scobie as president. They promptly reorganized as the Earl Motor Manufacturing Company in early 1923. The new company was capitalized at one million dollars. Soon, this group failed in pursuing their favored lower-volume approach, taking the company down with them. Early in 1924, servicing rights to the now defunct Earl were sold to Standard Motor Parts Company of Detroit. Total Earl production was approximately 1,900 cars.

The Earl was sold in Australia by Adelaide importer/agent Maugham-Thiem Motor Company. Approximately a dozen Model 40 vehicles were imported in August 1923, with Maugham-Thiem claiming that all except one had been sold shortly after arrival.. The Earl was still being sold in Adelaide up to at least mid-1925.

== Production figures 1921-1923 ==
Year	Production figures	Model	Serial number
1921	434	40	70000 to 70433
1922	1474	40	
1923	406	40	
Sum	2314	40	

== Rarity ==
The Earl Roadster that is alleged to be on display in the Ella Sharp Museum in Jackson, Michigan is actually a 1916 Marion, which was manufactured in Jackson.
