= George Earle =

George Earle may refer to:

- George Howard Earle Jr. (1856–1928), American lawyer
- George Howard Earle III (1890–1974), American politician, diplomat and governor of Pennsylvania
- George Earle (rugby union) (born 1987), South African rugby union footballer
- George Hussey Earle Sr. (1823–1907), Philadelphia lawyer and abolitionist

== See also ==
- George Earle Chamberlain (1854–1928), American politician, legislator, and public official in Oregon
- George Earle Buckle (1854–1935), English editor and biographer
- George Earl (disambiguation)
