= Imperial Automobile Company =

American automobile company

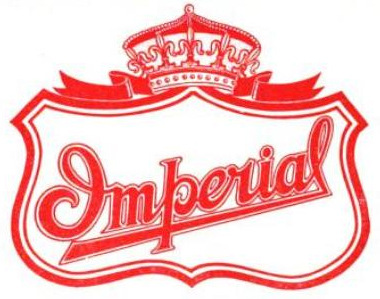
- Type: Automobile Manufacturing
- Industry: Automotive
- Genre: Touring cars, roadsters
- Predecessor: Jackson Carriage Company
- Founded: 1908; 118 years ago
- Founder: T. A. Campbell, George N. Campbell
- Defunct: 1916; 110 years ago
- Fate: Merged
- Successor: Mutual Motors Company
- Headquarters: Jackson, Michigan, United States
- Products: Automobiles
- Production output: unknown (1908-1916)

The Imperial Automobile Company of Jackson, Michigan, was formed by the brothers T. A. and George N. Campbell in 1908, who also ran the Jackson Carriage Company.

== History ==
Imperial produced mid-size cars with four-cylinder engines; the bodywork and mechanicals were primarily off-the-shelf rather than bespoke. Coachwork was done out-of-house by Beaudette Company, which also did work for Buick and Ford. In 1912 the Imperial factory burned down and the company moved into the old Buick truck plant. In 1914 a six-cylinder engine was introduced. Car production lasted until 1916.

In 1915, Imperial merged with Marion from Indianapolis, Indiana to form Mutual Motors Company. Under this new name, they stopped production of Imperials the following year. The new cars produced in Jackson were called Marion-Handley instead.

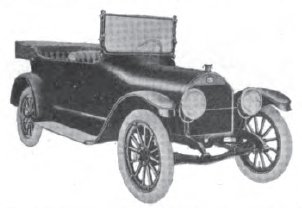
1916 Imperial

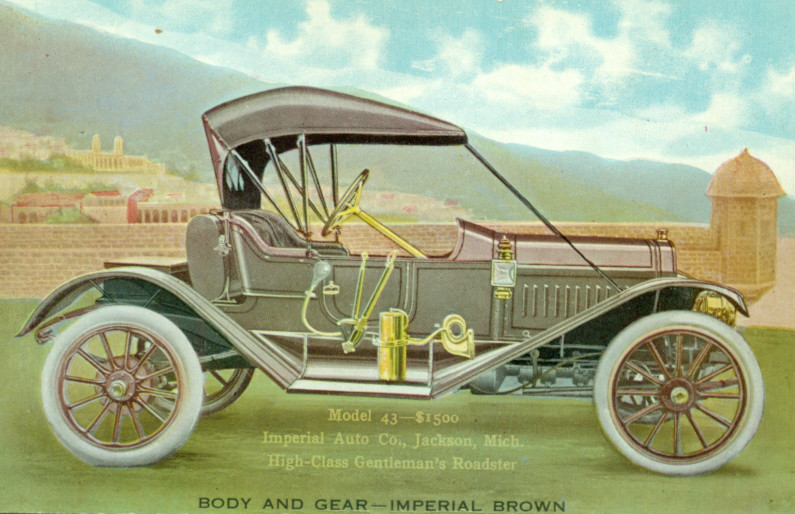
Model 43, circa 1910

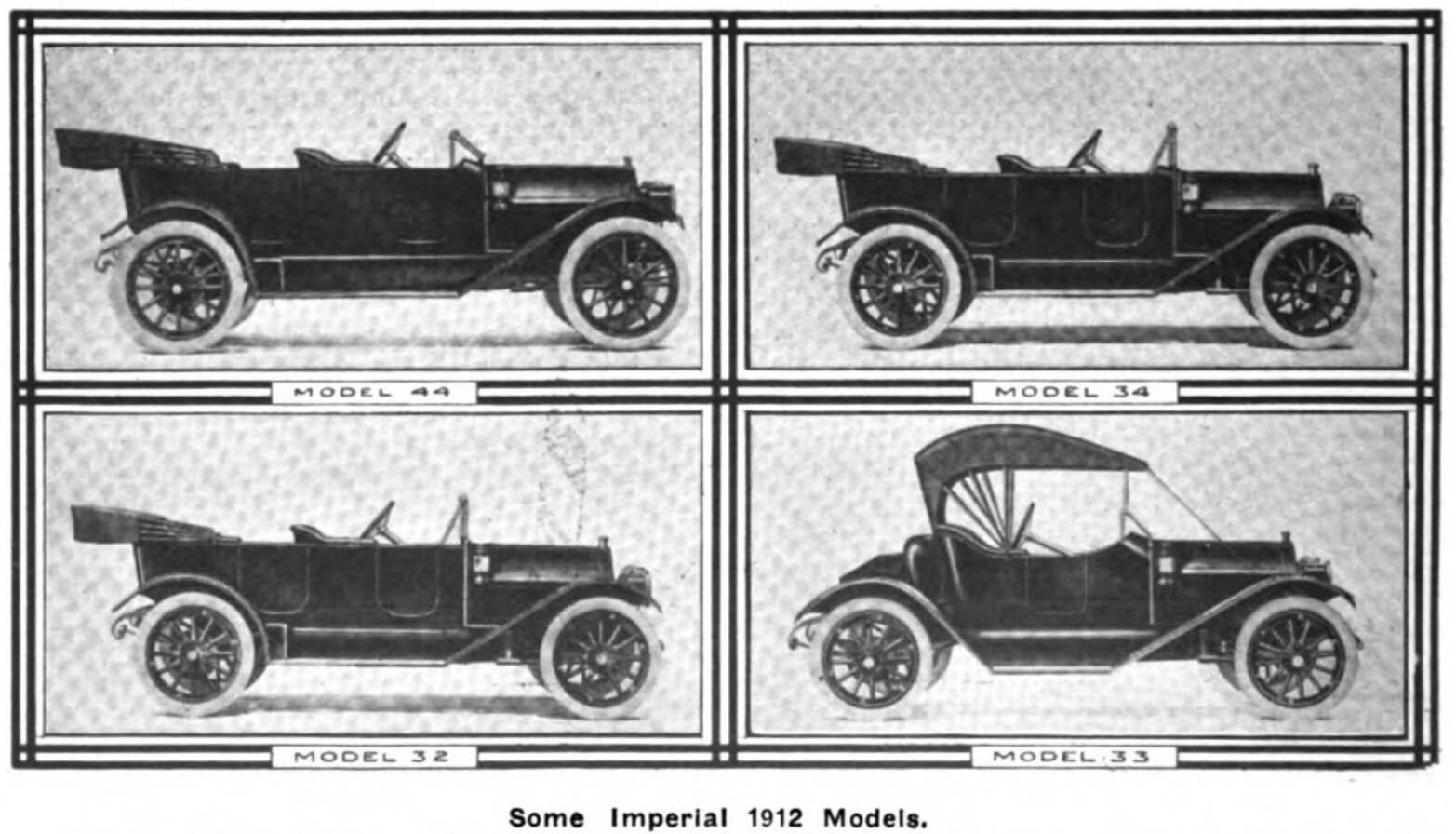
Imperial Model 32, 33, 34, 44 (1912)

== See also ==
- Brass Era car
- List of defunct United States automobile manufacturers
