= Earll =

Earll is a surname, and may refer to:

- Jane Earll (born 1958), Pennsylvania politician
- Jonas Earll Jr. (1786–1846), US congressman from New York
- Nehemiah H. Earll (1787–1872), US congressman from New York
- R. Edward Earll (1853–1896), American ichthyologist
- Warner Earll (1814–1888), justice of the Supreme Court of Nevada

== See also ==
- Earll v. State of Wyoming a textbook case on Harmless error
- Earl
- Earle (disambiguation)
