= Ear (disambiguation) =

The ear is the sense organ that detects sound.

Ear, EAR, or The Ear may also refer to:

== Arts, entertainment, and media ==
- Ear (band), an electronic music duo
- Experimental Audio Research, or EAR, a project by musician Peter Kember
- EAR Magazine, a monthly music magazine published 1973–1992
- The Ear, 1970 Czech film
- Playing by ear, a musical skill

== Economics and finance ==
- Economic activity rate, percentage of the population who constitutes the manpower supply of the labor market
- Effective annual rate of interest

== Government and politics ==
- EAR, an acronym for the Greek Left party
- European Agency for Reconstruction or EAR, a European Union agency
- Export Administration Regulations or EAR, a short name for the US Code of Federal Regulations Title 15 chapter VII, subchapter C

== Science ==
- Ear (botany), the seed-bearing part of a cereal plant, such as wheat
  - Ear of corn, the grain-bearing part of the maize plant
- Ear (mathematics), a type of polygon vertex
- Ear moth or Amphipoea oculea, a moth in the family Noctuidae
- East African Rift or EAR, a tectonic rift zone
- eps-Associated RNA element (or EAR), a motif associated with exopolysaccharide biosynthesis
- Estimated Average Requirements (or EAR) for nutritional needs

== Transport ==
- EAR, the FAA and IATA location identifier for Kearney Regional Airport, Nebraska, US
- EAR, the National Rail code for Earley railway station, Berkshire, UK

== Other uses ==
- EAR (file format) ("Enterprise ARchive" format), a file format used to package Java programming language applications
- Ear (rune), rune of the Anglo-Saxon futhorc
- Expired air resuscitation (or EAR), also known as rescue breathing

== See also ==
- EARS (disambiguation)
