= Mölndal =

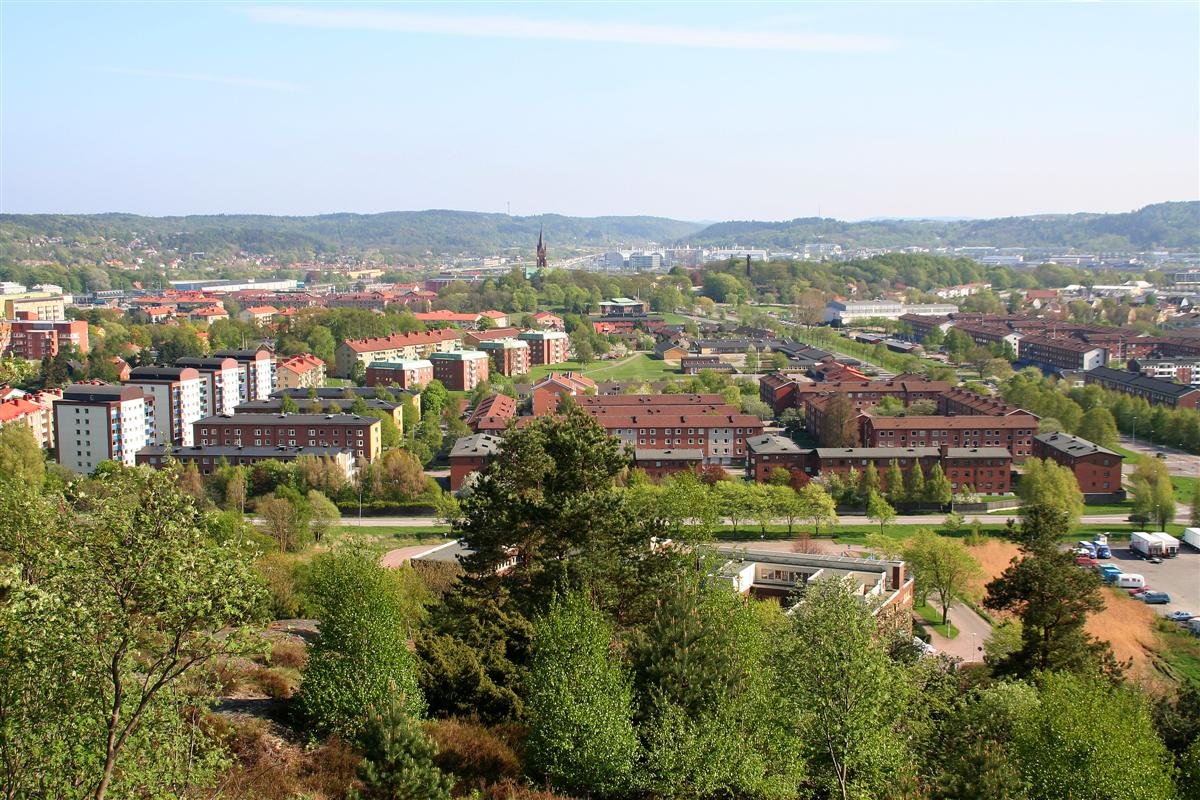
- Mölndal

- Coat of arms

- Location within Västra Götaland Location within Sweden
- Coordinates: 57°39′N 12°01′E
- Country: Sweden
- Municipality: Mölndal Municipality
- County: Västra Götaland County
- Province: Västergötland
- Time zone: UTC+1 (CET)
  - Summer (DST): UTC+2 (CEST)
- Climate: Cfb
- Website: www.molndal.se

Mölndal (Swedish pronunciation: [ˈmœ̌lndal]) is the seat and administrative centre of Mölndal Municipality and a part of the Gothenburg urban area on the west coast of Sweden. About 40,000 of the municipality's 60,000 inhabitants live in Mölndal proper.

== Geography ==
Mölndal is located on the western main line railway between Gothenburg and Malmö and the European highways E6/E20 run through the area from north to south. Mölndal is served by the Gothenburg tramway system.

== History ==
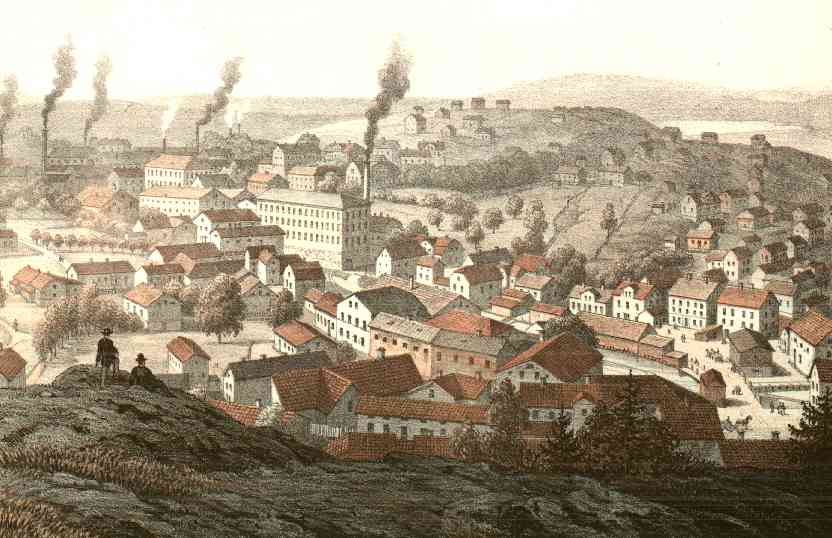
Mölndal in 1870

The name of the city derives from two words; Möln, which is a short form for Möllor, an old word for mills, and the word dal, which is the Swedish word for valley. Mölndal is the "Valley of mills". The narrow but high and long waterfalls in Kvarnbyn gave the necessary power to all the watermills that together with the windmills on the hills gave birth to the early industrialisation of Mölndal.

== Industry ==
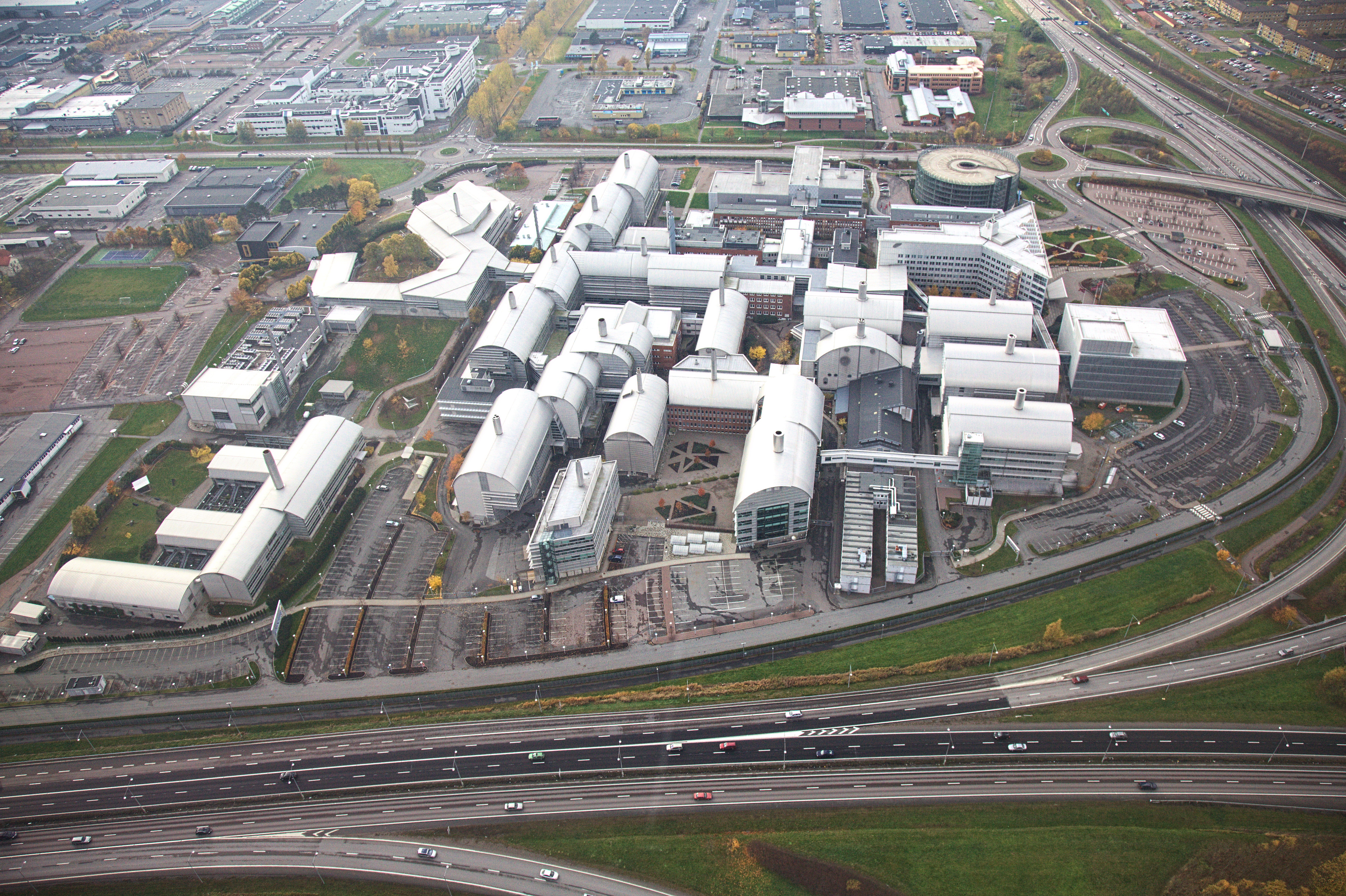
AstraZeneca's global research centre in Mölndal

Mölndal is best known for its high concentration of companies in life sciences. AstraZeneca has one of its global research centres here with more than 3,100 employees. Several other companies in areas of research such as pharmaceuticals, biomedicine, and biotechnology are also located here. The proximity to the University of Gothenburg and to Chalmers University of Technology - with their technology parks - has supported development of other sectors, such as microwave technology and information technology. Two national research institutes, IFP SICOMP AB and IVF Industrial Research and Development Corporation, are also located in Mölndal.

=== Mölndalsfallen ===
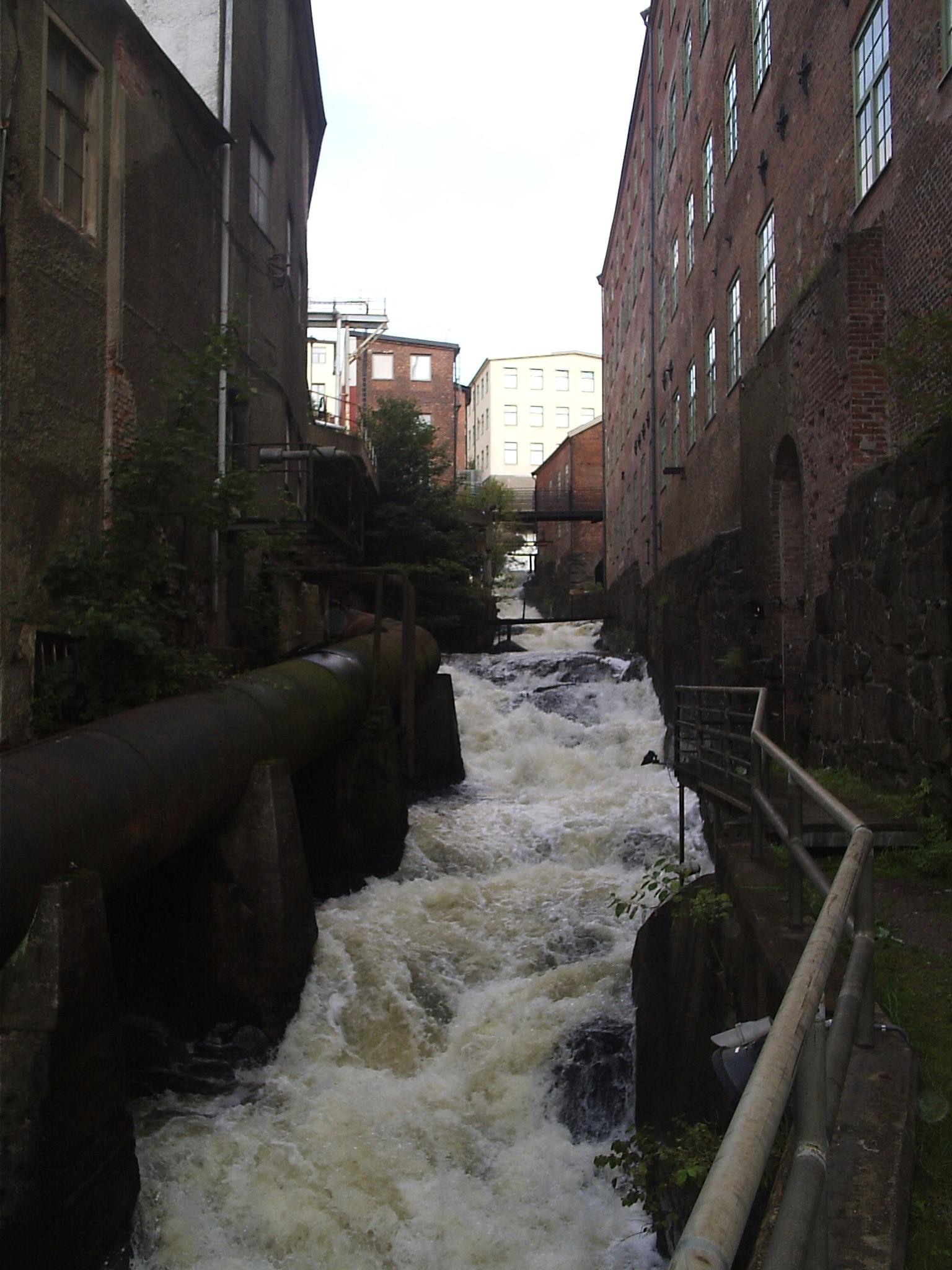
Mölndalsfallen in 2006

Mölndalsfallen (Mölndal falls) has been a big part of the Mölndal industries, which got their power from the falls to make cotton, paper and oil.

== Sports ==
The following sports clubs are located in Mölndal:

- Fässbergs IF
- Balltorps FF
- IF Mölndal Hockey
- Jitex BK
- Dalen/Krokslätts FF
- Kvarnby Basket

The town is also home to the Hills Golf Club.

== European Cooperation ==
- Mölndal is a member city of Eurotowns network

== Notable people ==
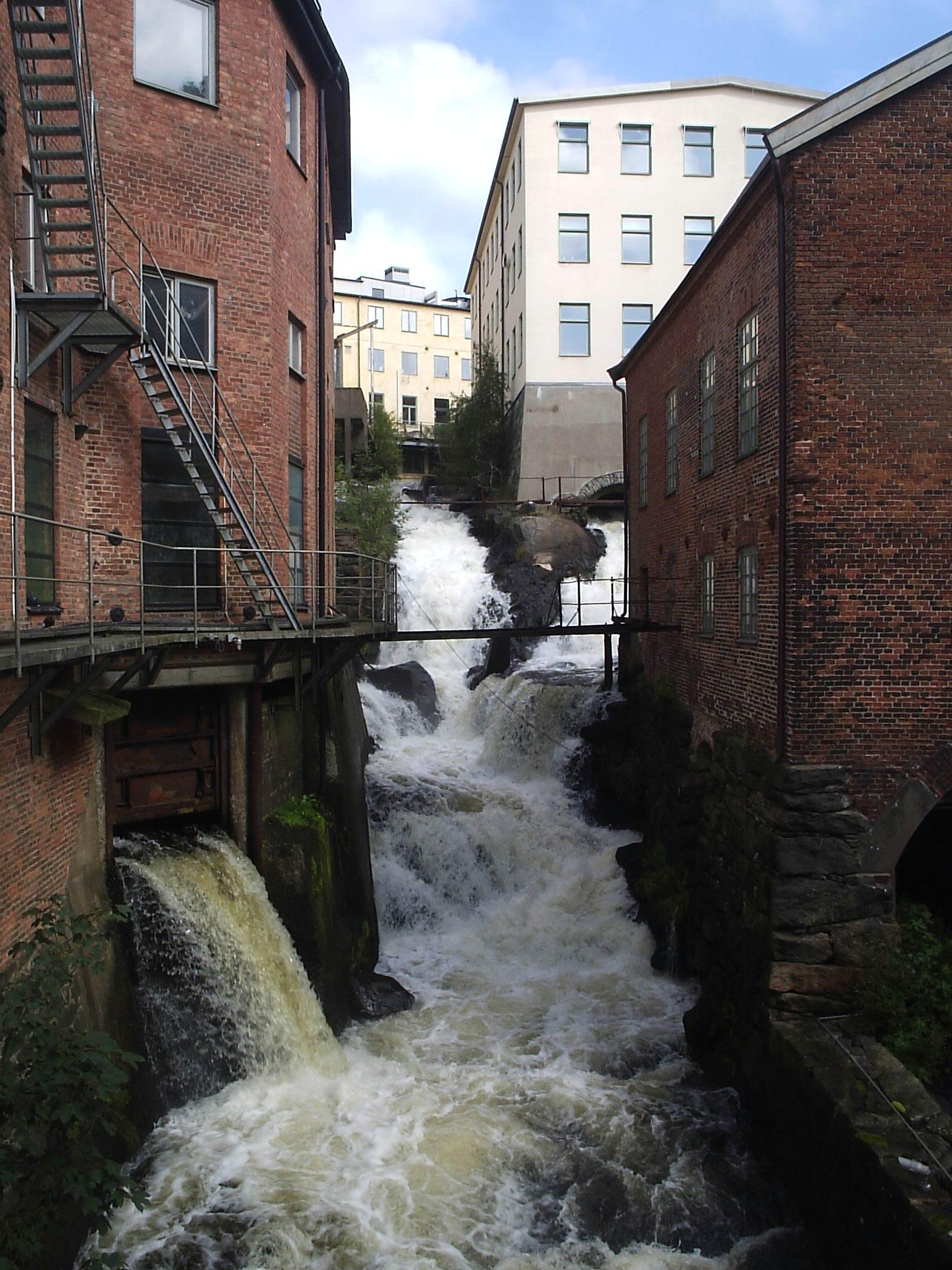
Mölndal's old industrial area, today a tourist attraction

- Per Andersson (actor), comedian
- Avatar, Swedish heavy metal band
- Oscar Dronjak, guitarist and founder of the Swedish heavy metal band HammerFall
- Anders Frisk, football (soccer) referee
- Björn Goop, horse driver and trainer (trotting)
- Ulla Jacobsson, actor
- Erica Johansson, long jumper
- Anna Kjellbin, ice hockey player
- Mats Levén, metal singer
- Claes Malmberg, actor and stand-up comedian
- Annelie Pompe, world record holder in variable weights freediving
- Hasse Thomsen, Boxer

== See also ==
- ERL (automobile manufacturer)
