= Marion-Handley =

Automobile built in Jackson, Michigan by the Mutual Motors Company from 1916 to 1919

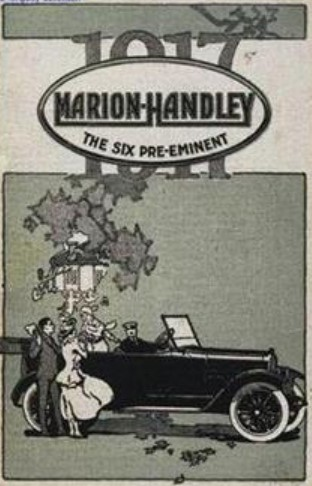
- Marion Handley Brochure Cover

Overview
- Type: Touring car
- Manufacturer: Mutual Motors Corporation
- Production: 1916–1918
- Assembly: Jackson, Michigan

Body and chassis
- Body style: Touring, Roadster

Chronology
- Predecessor: Marion (automobile)

The Marion-Handley was an automobile built in Jackson, Michigan by the Mutual Motors Corporation from 1916 to 1918.

== History ==
Mutual Motors Corporation was formed by combining the Imperial Automobile Company and Marion Motor Car Company. The Imperial was discontinued and the Marion became the Marion-Handley.

Two models were available, a touring car and a four-seater roadster. The 6-40 model was built on a 10 ft (3,000 mm) wheelbase, and the 6-60 was offered with a 10 ft 5 in (3,180 mm) wheelbase. The Marion-Handley was an assembled car equipped with a Continental six-cylinder engine. Wooden artillery wheels were standard equipment on the touring car, but the roadster model offered wire wheels as an option. Factory price in 1917 was $1,575, equivalent to $39,580 in 2025. Mutual Motors ended production in 1918 after 2,081 cars had been produced. The factory was sold in 1919.

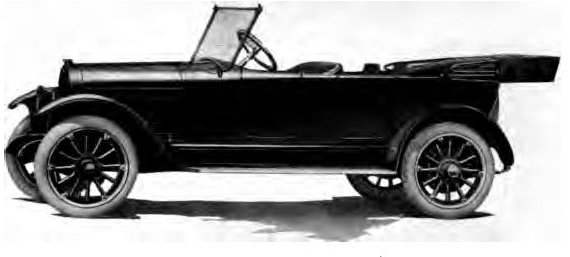
1916 Marion-Handley Touring Car
