= Giles Earle =

Giles Earle may refer to two English people:

- Giles Earle (musician) (fl. 1615)
- Giles Earle (politician) (1678–1758)
