= Robert Earle (disambiguation) =

Robert or Robbie Earle may refer to:

- Robert Earle (1926–2019), American game show host
- Robbie Earle (born 1965), English-born Jamaican international soccer player

== See also ==
- Robert Earl (disambiguation)
