= Joey (restaurant) =

Western Canadian casual restaurant chain

Joey Tomato’s (Canada) Inc.
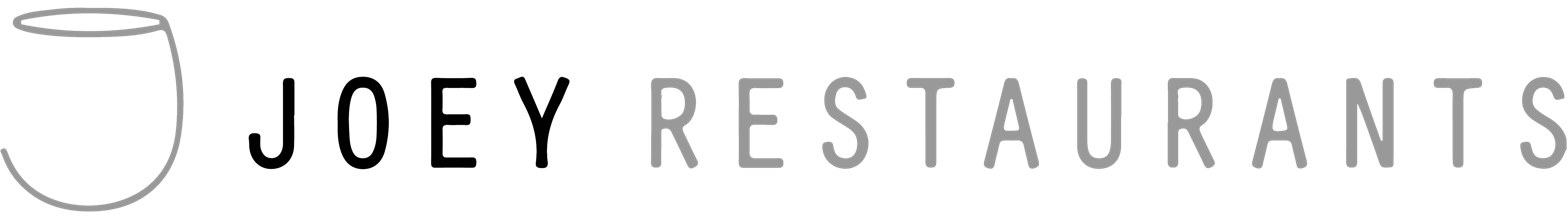
- Type: Private
- Industry: Restaurant
- Genre: Premium Casual
- Founded: 1992; 34 years ago Calgary, Alberta, Canada
- Founder: Jeff Fuller
- Headquarters: 2400-1177 West Hastings Street, Vancouver, British Columbia, Canada
- Number of locations: 32 (2025)
- Areas served: United States, Canada
- Key people: Jeff Fuller (Founder), Chris Mills (Executive Chef)
- Products: Burgers, Steaks, Chicken, Sushi, Salads, Desserts
- Revenue: $280.7 million per year
- Net income: n/a
- Number of employees: 1358
- Website: http://joeyrestaurants.com/

Joey Restaurant Group (stylized as JOEY) is a Western Canadian premium casual restaurant chain based out of Vancouver, British Columbia, Canada. The Joey chain of restaurants was founded by Jeff Fuller. Joey restaurants are a part of a chain of family-owned restaurants, expanding throughout North America. The restaurant focuses on Asian, American, Mediterranean and other global dishes. As of 2026, the company operates 35 full-service restaurants in Canada and the United States. All Joey restaurants feature a bar area and serve alcoholic beverages.

== History ==
The first Joey Restaurant was opened in 1992 in Calgary, Alberta.

The company's founding President and CEO is Jeff Fuller, son of restaurateur Leroy "Bus" Fuller (1928–2019), who founded the Earls restaurant chain with Jeff's brother Stan Fuller. Leroy Fuller was an experienced restaurateur who built the family restaurant empire stemming from one of the original A&W Restaurant franchises in Canada, an American chain of fast-food restaurants known for draft root beers, floats and burgers.

Joey was originally conceived as a pasta house called "Joey Tomato's", which opened in Calgary in 1992 as a casual pasta and pizza joint. As more menu items were added, eight years later, the name was changed to "Joey Tomato's Mediterranean Grill," before being shortened in 2005 to simply "Joey." Executive Chef Chris Mills began adding Asian cuisine to the menu as a way to rebrand the image. The company also owns the American restaurant Cucina, Cucina.

In 2016, Al Jessa was promoted to company President, marking another link between the Earls chain and Joey. Al Jessa's twin brother Mo Jessa is the current president of Earls.

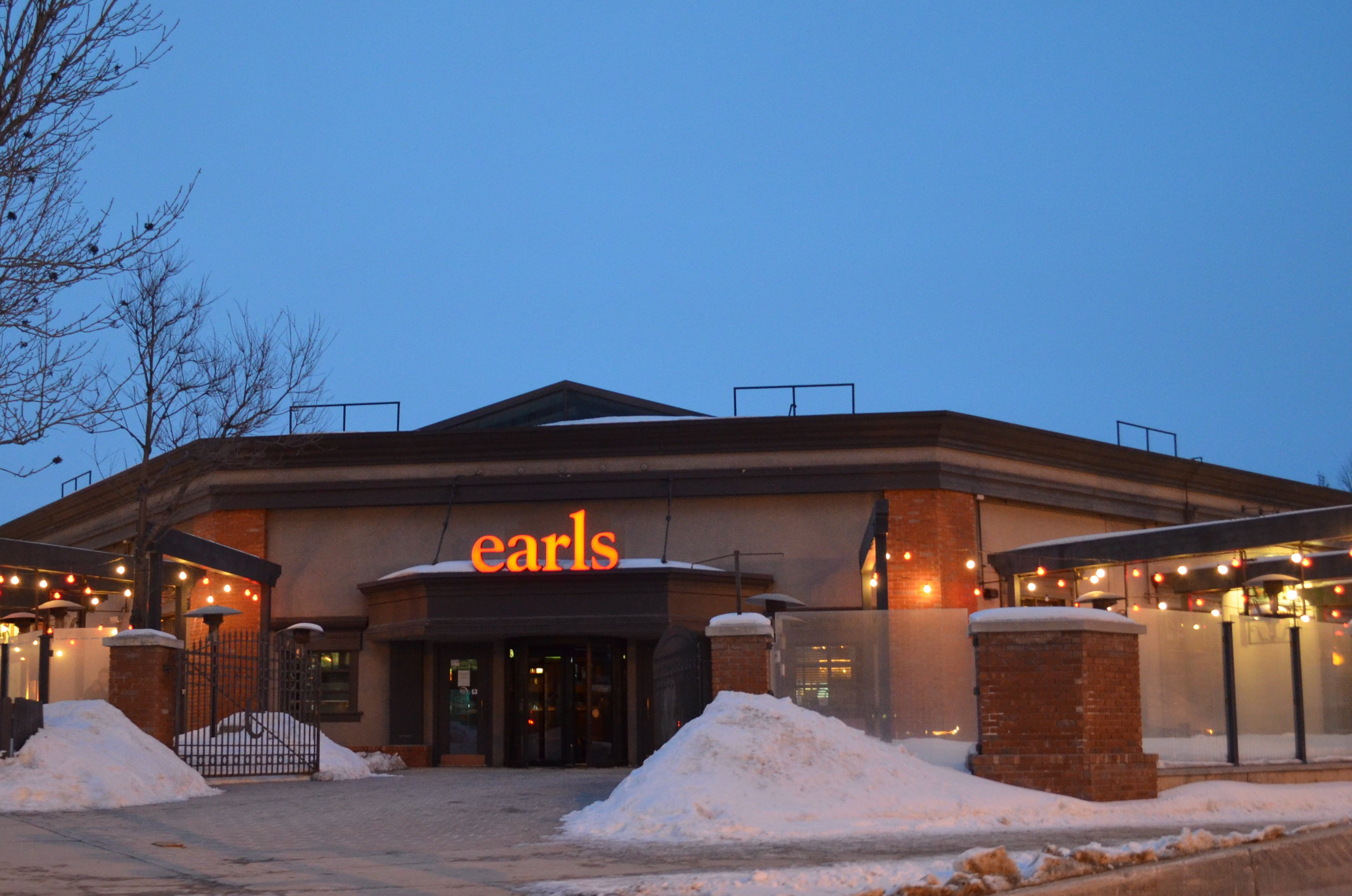
Earls restaurant in Winnipeg, Manitoba

As of March 2020, Al Jessa is President Emeritus and Layne Krienke, former COO, was promoted to president.

== Locations ==
=== Canada ===
There are 23 locations based in Canada: Calgary, Edmonton, Winnipeg, Kelowna, Ottawa, Toronto and Vancouver.

=== United States ===
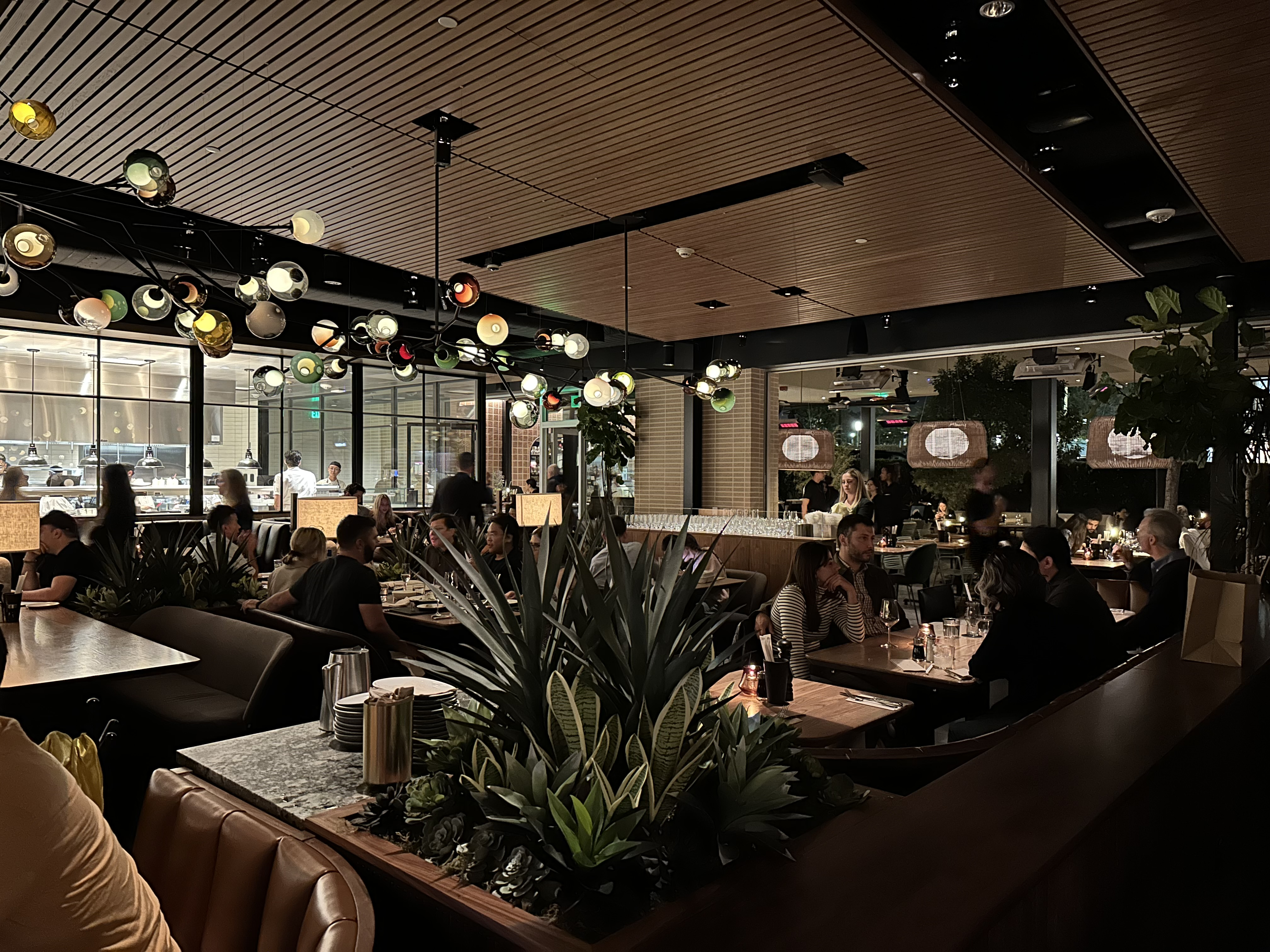
Interior view of Fashion Island Newport Beach Joey

The restaurant chain currently has locations in the states of California, Washington, two in Texas and one in Florida. Locations in California include Woodland Hills, Manhattan Beach, Newport Beach, and Downtown Los Angeles. The locations in the state of Washington include Bellevue, Tukwila and Seattle. The Texas locations are in Houston and Dallas. The Florida location is in Miami.

One location closed down in the Seattle South Lake Union area in November 2013, opening a new location in Seattle's University Village shortly after. The previous location fell victim to traffic and construction congestion in the area.

The newer Joey location based in Seattle is called Joey Kitchen, the only one of its kind serving test kitchen items. Test kitchen items include dishes and drinks only offered through this specific restaurant, expanding to other locations throughout Canada and the United States if enjoyed by guests. The location was designed by Olson Kundig.

On July 31, 2019, another location opened up in Downtown Los Angeles named Joey DTLA. The location joins in with other diverse businesses as part of The Bloc community.

On March 4, 2021, Joey Manhattan Beach opened up. This location is inside the village.

On July 28, 2021, Joey Uptown opened outside the Houston Galleria in Texas.

The restaurant chain opened a new location in the Fashion Island shopping mall in Newport Beach, California in January 2023.

== Other restaurants ==
=== Local Public Eatery ===
The Joey Restaurant Group is an umbrella company to LOCAL Public Eatery. LOCAL provide cheaper menu options and bar food.

=== Earls ===
Restaurant founder, Leroy Earl "Bus" Fuller, died at the age of 90. Earls has since been operated by Jeff Fuller's brother, Stan Fuller, who also owns a large share of the Cactus Club chain, a competitor to the restaurant.

=== Saltlik ===
Brother of Jeff and Stan Fuller, Stewart Fuller, runs Saltlik, a casual fine steakhouse chain.

=== Cactus Club Cafe ===
In 2022, the Fuller family bought control of the Cactus Club Cafe.

== Theme ==
Joey Restaurants can be considered premium casual, with the restaurants typically following a dimly-lit industrial chic interior design style. The company claims that each restaurant is unique, individually designed with its surroundings in mind.

== Menu ==
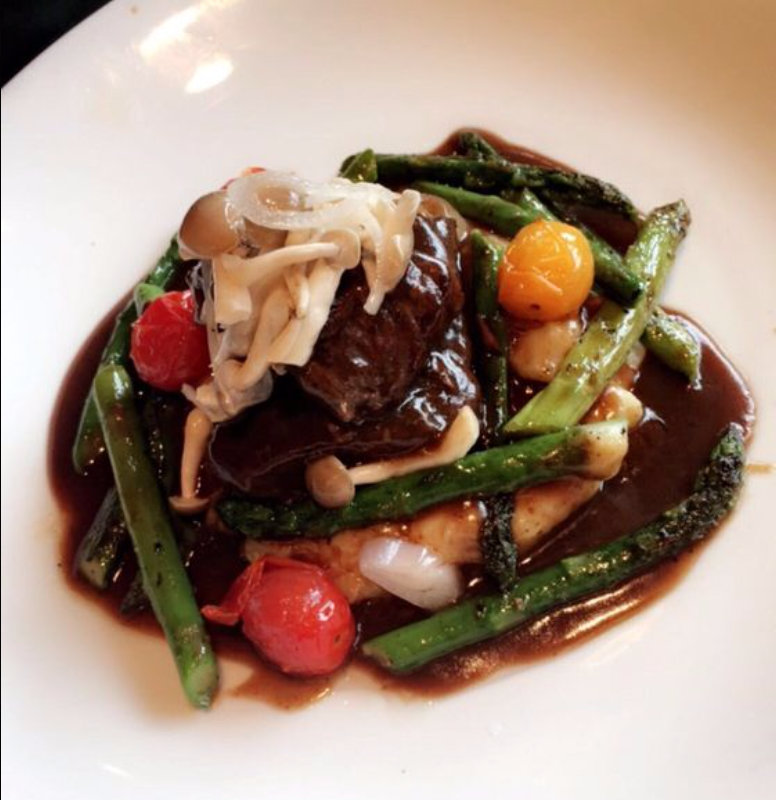
Balsamic Braised Short Rib offered at Joey locations.

The restaurant serves "globally-inspired" foods. The menu varies by location.

== Awards ==
Joey was consistently recognized as one of the Best Places to Work Best Workplace in Canada for a consecutive thirteen years from 2010 to 2023. The company has also been awarded as one of the Top Employers for Young People. According to Forbes, the restaurant dropped off the list in 2019. "JOEY Restaurant Group". Forbes.

== See also ==
- List of Canadian restaurant chains
- Earls (restaurant chain)
- Cactus Club Cafe
- List of restaurants in Vancouver
