= Effects range low and effects range median =

Measures of toxicity in marine sediment

In environmental toxicology, effects range low (ERL) and effects range median (ERM) are measures of toxicity in marine sediment. They are used by public agencies in the United States in formulating guidelines in assessing toxicity hazards, in particular from trace metals or organic contaminants.

The ERL and ERM measures are expressed as specific chemical concentrations of a toxic substance in sediment. The ERL indicates the concentration below which toxic effects are scarcely observed or predicted: the ERM indicates that above which effects are generally or always observed. They are derived from biological toxicity assays and synoptic sampling.

The numerical values are incorporated in sediment quality guidelines (SQGs) that were developed by Long and Morgan for the National Oceanic and Atmospheric Administration (NOAA) National Status & Trends program as informal tools to evaluate whether a concentration of a contaminant in sediment might have toxicological effects. These guidelines are used for screening sediments for trace metals and organic contaminants. They are not regulatory criteria in any way and are not intended to be used as such.

== Derivation ==
NOAA originally calculated ERL/ERMs using existing toxicity data compiled from completed toxicity assays with varying endpoints, including effects on commonly tested organisms, particularly at sensitive life stages. The process is considered a "weight of evidence approach", in which results are based on a large database of previously conducted studies. The studies used included synoptically collected sediment chemical analyses and toxicity effects data. Using data already collected ("data mining") has the advantage of being able to quickly and inexpensively make an assessment with a large dataset that would otherwise require much more time-consuming and costly specific toxicity assays. Compiled data sets include a variety of endpoints including mortality, reproduction, growth rate, and juvenile survival in sediment toxicity data sets for all organisms for which tests have been conducted. Studies are screened, and only those assays using standardized methods and resulting in significant effects are used for the determination of ERL/ERM guidelines.

In summary, the key links between the compiled studies are the testing of a specific analyte - toxicity assays used are for sediment, and a significant effect must be determined. The data is arranged by ordering the concentrations from lowest to highest. After ranking, both the 10th and 50th percentile concentrations are determined over the range of endpoint concentrations. The 10th percentile of the ranked data is identified as the ERL, and is considered indicative of concentrations below which adverse effects (relatively) rarely occur. The 50th percentile of the ranked data is identified as the ERM, and is indicative of concentrations above which adverse effects (relatively) frequently occur.

== Government agency use ==
Sediment Quality Guidelines (SQGs) are used by US federal agencies, state agencies, and environmental consulting firms to characterize toxic levels of chemicals in marine and freshwater sediment. Following here is a summary of how the ERL/ERM guidelines are used by the National Oceanic and Atmospheric Administration, United States Geological Survey (USGS), and the United States Environmental Protection Agency (EPA).

=== NOAA ===
NOAA scientists use SQGs as a way to estimate if a concentration of contaminant in a sediment sample may have toxicological effects. The original intent of using SQGs was to rank order areas that may need further toxicological testing and potential chemicals of concern. Across the United States, NOAA has used these guidelines in regional surveys to determine the degree of contamination relative to other areas, and to identify if the concentration of a chemical exceeded guidelines, indicating a possible adverse effect.

NOAA also reports ERLs and ERMs, along with other guidelines, on tables known as Screening Quick Reference Tables (SQuiRT) cards. These tables offer values that may be used in the preliminary screening of sediment or other media for toxic hazards.

=== USGS ===
The USGS makes use of both ERL and ERM on a case-by-case basis. During a study involving the concentration of heavy metals, pesticides, and semi-volatile organic compounds in stream sediments from the Schuylkill River within the Valley Forge National Historical Park, the USGS used the ERL and ERM to determine locations that could potentially pose a threat to living organisms. The USGS has also integrated ERL and ERM values into an Alert Range Table, a table that provides ranges of contaminant concentrations that predict the likelihood of adverse effects occurring in benthic organisms for the Lake Pontchartrain Basin in Louisiana. Both the ERL and ERM have proven to be useful guideline values for predicting toxicity during studies conducted by the USGS.

=== EPA ===
The EPA uses ERL and ERM values as a type of sediment “benchmark”. They define a benchmark as a concentration that, when exceeded, has the potential to cause harm or significant risk to humans or animals in the environment. The EPA has also used ERL and ERM values for sediment contamination studies. Assessment categories defining the condition of sampled sediments have been used by the EPA in the past. Categories have been characterized as “good” for zero ERL exceedances, “intermediate” if there are ERL exceedances but zero ERM exceedances, and “poor” for any ERM exceedance. The EPA credits the ERL and ERM as valuable benchmarks that assist in providing a uniform context for evaluating contaminant levels within estuaries.

== Reliability ==
Long and colleagues, using both "effects" and "no effects" data, determined measures of the accuracy of the guidelines by calculating the percent incidence of effects occurring within the ranges delineated by ERL/ERM. The percent incidence of effects was calculated by dividing the number of effects entries by the total number of entries and multiplying by 100.

For trace metals, the guidelines for copper, lead, and silver were the most accurate - below the ERL concentration, there was less than a 10% incidence of effects. A steady increase was seen between the ERL and ERM concentrations, and above the ERM, the incidence of effects was greater than 83%.

The organic contaminant guidelines also appeared to be very accurate for all classes of polycyclic aromatic hydrocarbons (PAHs) and most of the individual PAHs. The incidence of effects was 25% or below when the concentrations were below the respective ERL value, with only (fluorene as an exception, while the incidence of effects was 75% or greater at concentrations above the respective ERM, excepting dibenzo(a,h)anthracene, p,p’-DDE, total dichlorodiphenyltrichloroethane (DDT), and total Polychlorinated biphenyls (PCBs). Importantly, one hundred percent effects were seen in concentrations above the ERM for acenaphthylene, 2-methyl naphthalene, and low-molecular weight PAHs, and ninety percent or greater effects in this range were seen for chromium, lead, silver, benz(a)anthracene, and fluoranthene.

Contaminants that were reported as having low accuracies included nickel, mercury, chromium, total PCBs, p,p’-DDE, and total DDT.

== Comparison to other SQGs (case studies) ==
Multiple case studies have been conducted to compare different sediment quality guidelines (SQGs) and their ability to predict sediment toxicity. The original intent of NOAA in developing ERL/ERMs was to create a ranking system for sediment site toxicity in order to compare one site to another. Although not the original intent, these guidelines have been compared to other SQGs to assess their ability to predict sediment toxicity in different organisms.

Long and co-workers also conducted a meta-analysis using 1068 sediment toxicity assays to evaluate the predictive ability of the ERL/ERM, PEL (predicted effects level), and TEL (threshold effects level) sediment quality guidelines. They found that the ERL most accurately predicted no-effects toxicity in benthic organisms. Furthermore, it was shown that as the number of SQGs exceeded increased, the resulting toxicity of the sediment increased as well, providing strong evidence that SCGs are useful in predicting sediment toxicities. It was noted, however, that when chemicals existed in mixtures, the toxicity of sediments increased, possibly at concentrations lower than the ERL and TEL.

Vidal and Bay showed that the ERM performed better than the AET (apparent effects threshold) and EqP (equilibrium partitioning) at predicting a non-toxic sediment concentration, and in general was more conservative in its estimates than the SQGQ1 (sediment quality guideline quotient) and MECq (moderate effects concentration). The purpose of their study was to compare common SQGs used for site assessments in California. Both of these studies suggested using multiple SQGs, and gave guidance on selecting the best method based on site characteristics and the contaminants of immediate concern.

== Drawbacks to the ERL/ERM approach ==
ERLs and ERMs must be used with caution. Overestimating the ability of these values to signal whether or not sediment may be toxic can lead to poor decisionmaking. Certain considerations must be made, and the weaknesses of these values understood, so that ERL and ERM screening levels are used properly.

The ERL and ERM are not threshold values to determine whether toxicity will occur - they are relationships between bulk chemical concentrations and toxicity effects that are expressed along a continuum. There is no concentration above which toxicity will occur and below which toxicity will not occur. This fact may be overlooked by some users of ERL/ERM's, and do so could mislead the decisionmaking process.

The derivation of ERL and ERM can also cause further misconceptions - since only effects data is used in determining an ERL/ERM, there are also overlapping concentrations where there is no co-occurrence of toxicity. Concentrations that did not elicit a significant effect are left out of the calculation when determining the 10th and 50th percentile values (ERL and ERM respectively). Therefore, within the ranges delineated by the ERL and ERM values, concentrations exist that were found to not have a significant biological effect.

Many substances that are found to be very toxic do not have SQGs associated with them. The ability of an SQG to predict toxicity when other substances, without SQGs, are present, is currently unknown.

Particle size also plays an important role in chemical concentrations, and this factor is ignored in calculating the ERL and ERM. When using these values for screening contaminated sediment, it is likely that the ERL will be exceeded more often when the sediment contains a larger proportion of fine-grained material. This is due to the inverse relationship between chemical concentration and particle size. Due to sediment concentrations being measured on a dry weight basis, other geochemical factors of sediment that may also influence contaminant bioavailibility are not considered.

Another consideration is that effects to wildlife and humans from bioaccumulation are not considered in ERL and ERM measurements.

Furthermore, Vidal and Bay noted that the use of ERMs when DDT is present resulted in a less accurate predictive level. The authors suggested that this provides evidence that other methods could prove more protective in cases where mixtures of organics are present.
