= Andy Earl =

Andy Earl may refer to:

- Andrew Earl (climber), English climber and coach
- Andy Earl (rugby union) (born 1961), New Zealand rugby union player
- Andrew Earl (volleyball) (born 1982), Australian volleyball player
