= Robert Earl (disambiguation) =

Robert Earl (born 1951) is the founder and CEO of Planet Hollywood International, Inc.

Robert Earl may also refer to:

- Robert Earl (judge) (1824–1902), Chief Judge of the NY Court of Appeals
- Robert Earl (singer) (1926–2025), English singer
- Robert Earl (U.S. Marine), United States Marine lieutenant colonel
- Bob Earl (born 1950), American racing driver
- Rob Earl, member of The Medway Poets
- Robbie Earl (born 1985), American ice hockey player

== See also ==
- Robert Earle (disambiguation)
- Robert Earl Keen (born 1956), American singer-songwriter and entertainer
