= Cactus Club Cafe =

Canadian restaurant chain

Cactus Restaurants Ltd.

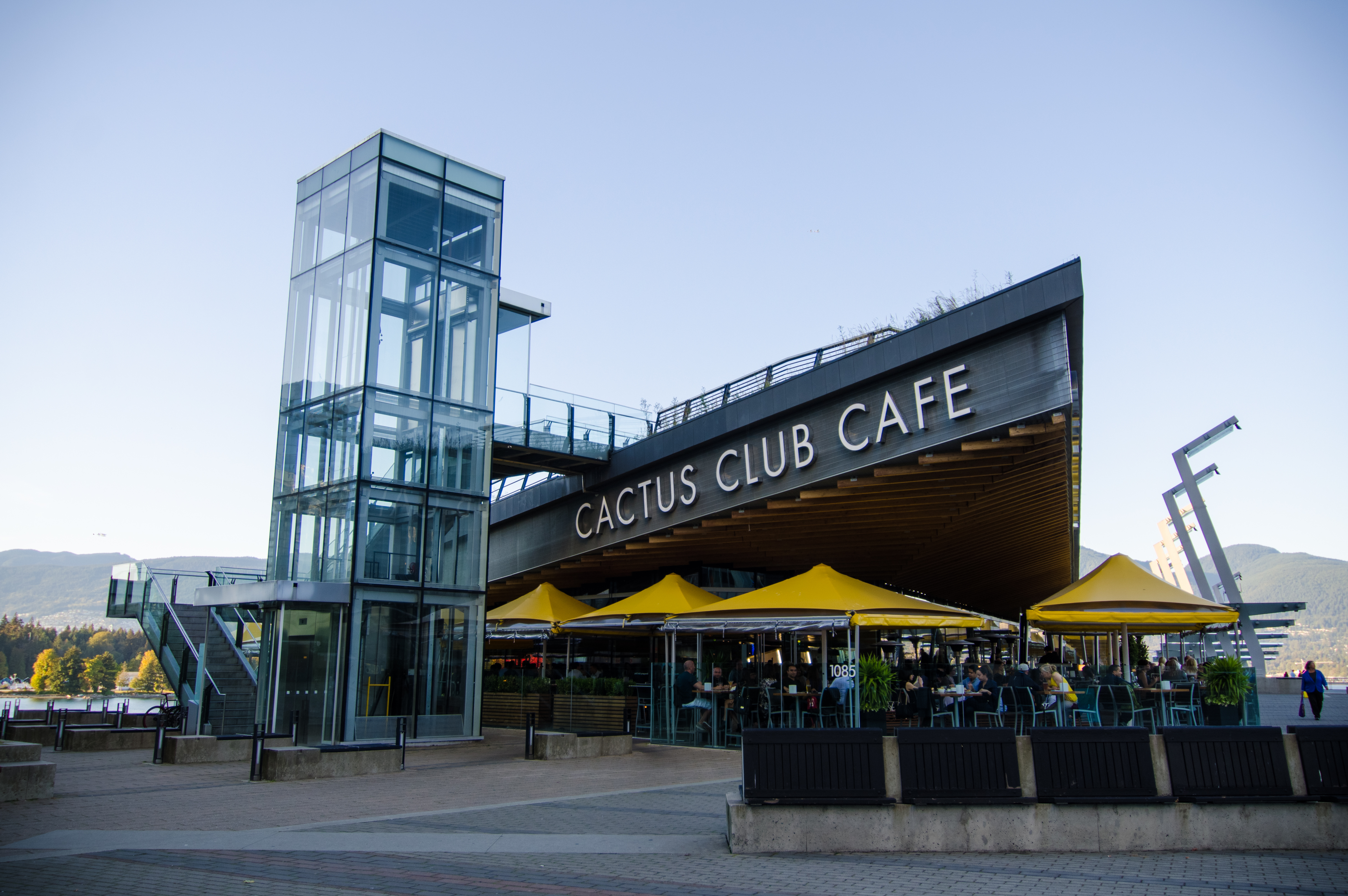
- Cactus Club Cafe at Coal Harbour in Vancouver
- Industry: Restaurant
- Genre: Premium Casual
- Founded: 1988; 38 years ago North Vancouver, British Columbia
- Founders: Richard Jaffray; Scott Morison
- Headquarters: Vancouver, British Columbia, Canada
- Number of locations: More than 30
- Areas served: Canada
- Key people: Andrew Latchford (President); Richard Jaffray (Founder); Gregory McCallum (Executive Chef of Culinary Development)
- Owners: The Fuller Family
- Website: www.cactusclubcafe.com

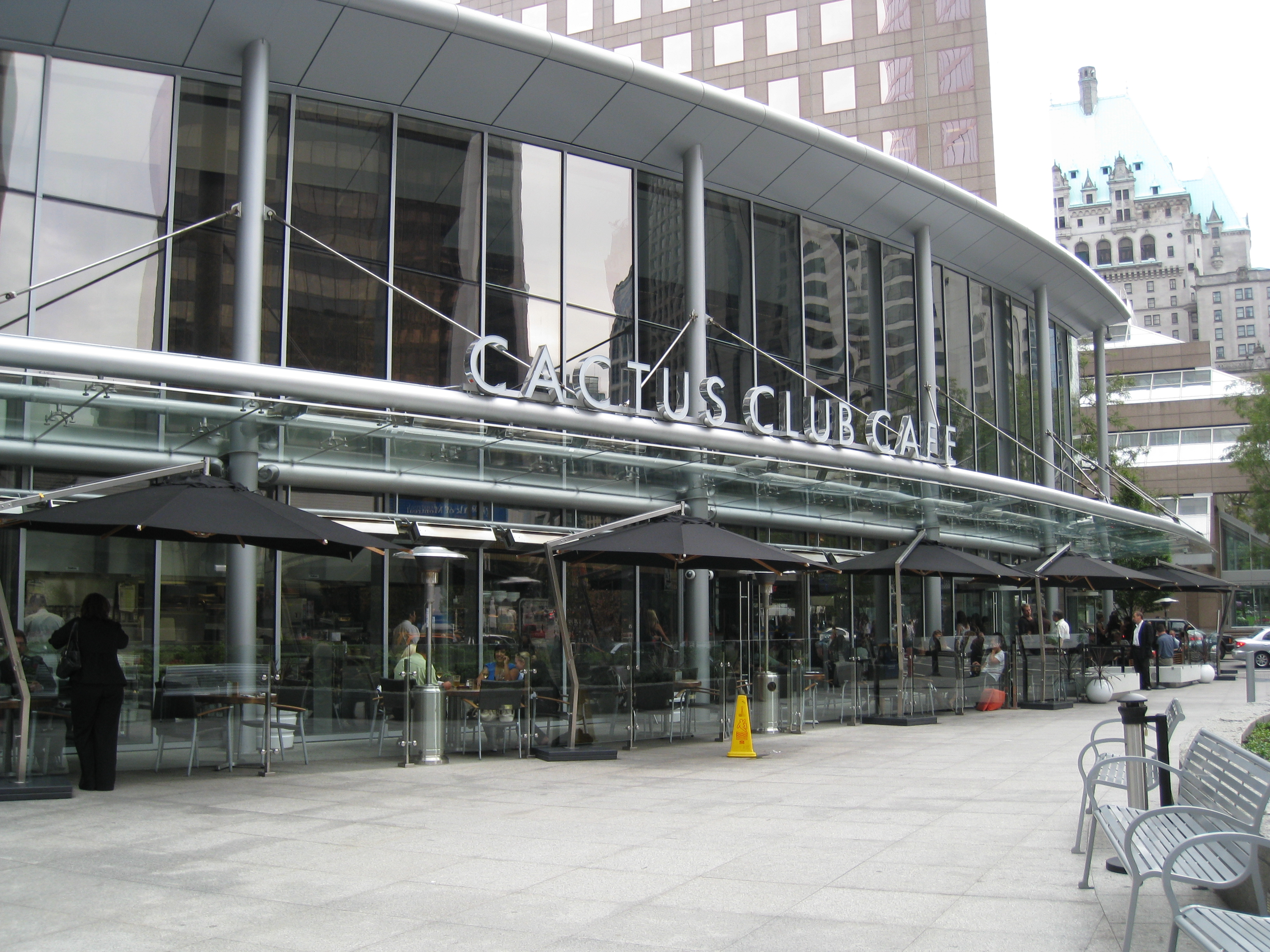
Cactus Club Cafe in Downtown Vancouver.

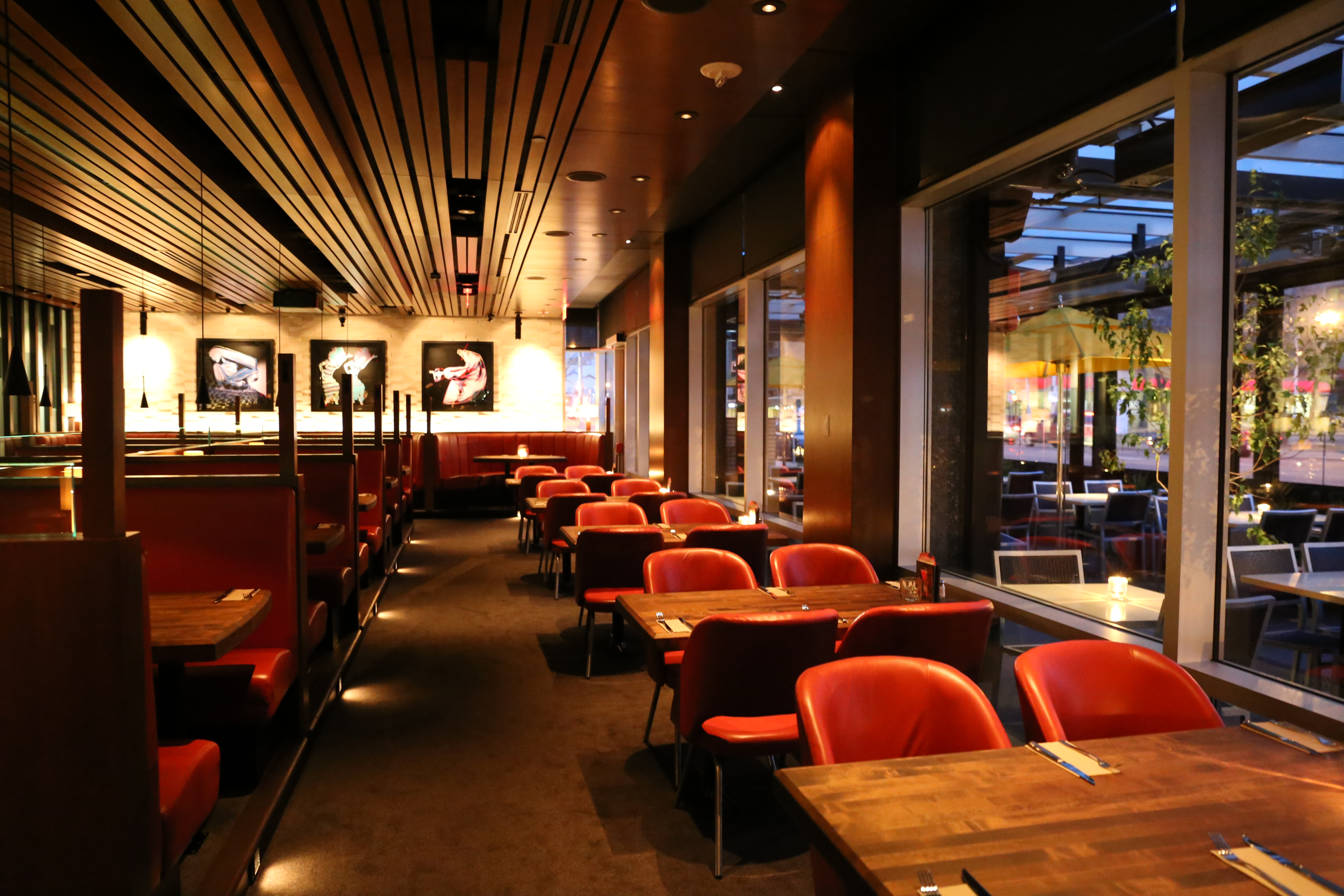
The interior of a Cactus Club Cafe location in Edmonton.

Cactus Club Cafe is a Canadian restaurant chain founded in 1988 and headquartered in North Vancouver, British Columbia. The chain has over 30 locations in British Columbia, Alberta, Saskatchewan, Ontario and the United States.

== History ==
Cactus Club Cafe was founded in 1988 by two former Earls waiters, Richard Jaffray and Scott Morison. The partners started with a restaurant named "Café Cucamongas", which they sold in 1988 to fund the establishment of the Cactus Club. In 1996, the company expanded into Alberta. By 1998 the company expanded to 10 locations in British Columbia and Alberta. In 2005, Richard Jaffray bought out Scott Morison's interest in the business.

By 2008, Cactus Club Cafe had 19 locations in British Columbia and Alberta. That year, the company took on Rob Feenie (the first Canadian to win Iron Chef America) as its executive chef. Feenie left in 2022, after roughly 15 years.

By 2013 the company had about 2,500 employees and 27 locations.

In February 2022, the Fuller family acquired full control of Cactus Club Cafe from Richard Jaffray.

Cactus Club Cafe opened its first location in the United States in Boston, Massachusetts in 2025 with a second in downtown Miami, Florida.

== Notable employees ==
In 2013, Matthew Stowe, a product development chef with Cactus Club Cafe, was named the winner of Top Chef Canada's third season. Former Iron Chef winner Rob Feenie served as executive chef from 2008 to 2022.

== See also ==
- List of Canadian restaurant chains
