= Marion (automobile) =

Defunct American motor vehicle manufacturer

Marion Motor Car Company
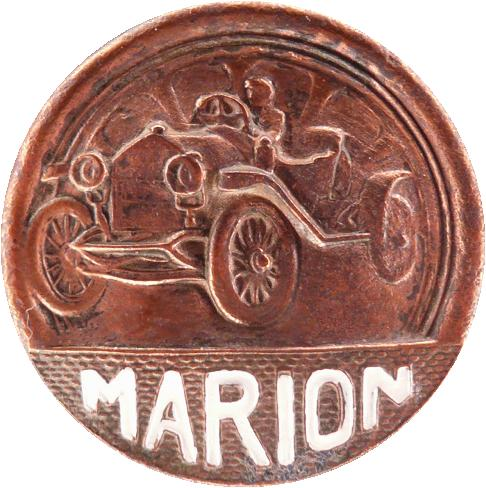
- Marion Radiator Emblem

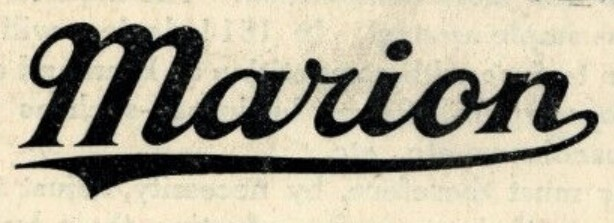
- The Car That Has Set Men to Thinking
- Industry: Automobile Manufacturing
- Founded: 1904; 122 years ago
- Defunct: 1915; 111 years ago
- Fate: Merger
- Successor: Mutual Motors Corporation
- Headquarters: Indianapolis, Indiana
- Key people: John N. Willys, Fred Tone, Robert Hassler, Harry C. Stutz
- Products: Automobiles
- Production output: 7,158 (1904-1915)

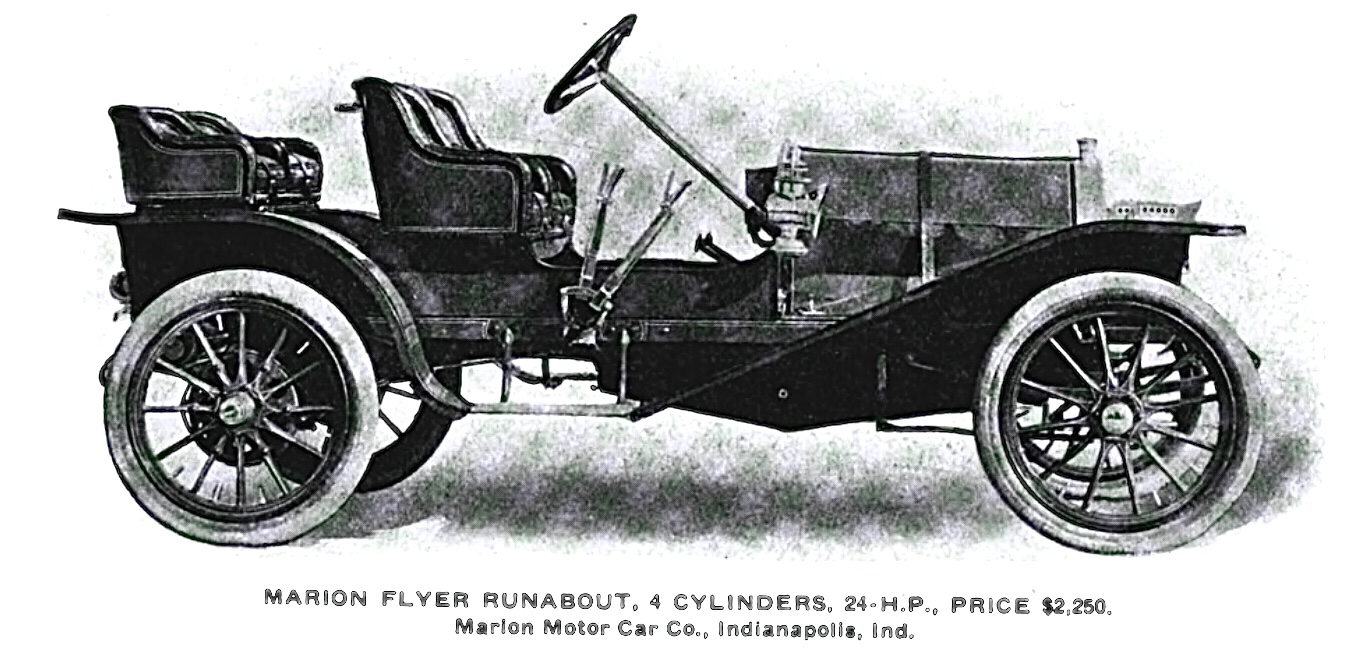
Marion Flyer Runabout (1908)

The Marion was an automobile produced by the Marion Motor Car Company in Indianapolis (Marion County), Indiana from 1904 to 1915.

Marion was also used for prototype automobiles in 1901 by the Marion Automobile Company of Marion, Ohio, which later operated as a garage. A Marion Flyer was listed in 1910 by the Marion Automobile & Manufacturing Company in Marion, Indiana, but no production was reported.

== History ==
In 1904 the Marion Motor Car Company, based in Indianapolis, entered automobile production building mid-priced to high-priced automobiles.

Early versions of the Marion car had transversely-mounted 16-hp Reeves air-cooled engines, and double chain drive. The appearance of the Marion car was very similar to the contemporary Premier (also an Indianapolis car). 1906 Marion cars had conventionally-placed 16 and 28-hp 4-cylinder Reeves engines, while later Marion cars used water-cooled engines by Continental and other firms of up to 48-hp.

Automotive engineers and designers, Robert Hassler, Fred Tone, George Schebler and Harry C. Stutz produced or designed models for Marion. Motor car racing was actively undertaken to provide recognition for Marion. Beginning in 1907 Harry Stutz was chief engineer for Marion. He designed a roadster named the Bobcat Speedster, which bore a close resemblance to the contemporaneous Stutz Bearcat Speedster.

John N. Willys, President of Overland Automobile Company, bought controlling interest in Marion in October, 1908. The Marion Motor Car Company remained under-capitalized until 1912, when capital stock was raised from $100,000 to $1,125,0000. J. I. Handley, president of American Motor Car Company became President of Marion Motor Car Company and combined their sales organizations.

In 1914 J.I. Handley purchased the assets of the Marion Company for $120,000. In December 1914, J.I. Handley's Mutual Motors Company resulted from a merger between Marion Motor Car Company and Imperial Automobile Company of Jackson, Michigan. Marion production was moved to Jackson, but ended in 1915. In 1916, the Marion-Handley became the automobile offered by Mutual Motors.

The Marion Motor Car Company manufactured 7,158 automobiles in all.

== Models ==
A prototype Marion roadster with a 9,455cc V12 engine was designed by George Schebler of carburetor fame, and built in the Marion factory in 1908.

In 1910, Harry C. Stutz developed his idea for a factory-built speedster called the Bobcat. They were designed as minimalist, stripped down vehicles that were fitted with the most powerful engine offered by Marion. The wheelbase measured 111-inches, had two-wheel mechanical brakes, and sold for $1,475, (equivalent to $50,967 in 2025). The Marion Bobcat Speedster was produced from 1911 through 1914.

Marions were available as touring cars or roadsters, and from 1911 as sedans and coupes.

Marion Models:

| Model | Model Years | Engine | Horsepower | Wheelbase (inches) | Factory Price (US$) |
|---|---|---|---|---|---|
| Four | 1904–1905 | 4-cylinder | 16 hp (12 kW) | 96 in (2,400 mm) | 1,500 |
| 2 | 1906 | 4-cylinder | 16 hp (12 kW) | 96 in (2,400 mm) | 1,500 |
| 5 | 1906 | 4-cylinder | 28 hp (21 kW) | 108 in (2,700 mm) | 2.500 |
| 7 | 1907 | 4-cylinder | 24 hp (18 kW) | 100 in (2,500 mm) | 2,000 to 3,000 |
| 8 | 1908–1909 | 4-cylinder | 24 hp (18 kW) | 102–104 in (2,600–2,600 mm) | 2,250 |
| 9 | 1908–1909 | 6-cylinder | 35 hp (26 kW) | 102–112 in (2,600–2,800 mm) | 1,850 to 2,750 |
| 10 | 1910 | 4-cylinder | 35 hp (26 kW) | 112 in (2,800 mm) | 1,850 |
| 30 | 1911 | 4-cylinder | 30 hp (22 kW) | 110 in (2,800 mm) | 1,000 to 1,200 |
| 40 | 1911 | 4-cylinder | 40 hp (30 kW) | 115 in (2,900 mm) | 1,600 to 1,650 |
| Four-30 | 1912 | 4-cylinder | 30 hp (22 kW) | 111 in (2,800 mm) | 1,150 to 1,285 |
| Four-45 | 1912 | 4-cylinder | 45 hp (34 kW) | 120 in (3,000 mm) | 1,750 |
| 37-A | 1913 | 4-cylinder | 40 hp (30 kW) | 112 in (2,800 mm) | 1,475 |
| 48-A | 1913 | 4-cylinder | 48 hp (36 kW) | 120 in (3,000 mm) | 1,850 |
| B | 1914 | 4-cylinder | 25 hp (19 kW) | 117 in (3,000 mm) | 1,650 to 2,150 |
| G | 1914–1915 | 6-cylinder | 33 hp (25 kW) | 124 in (3,100 mm) | 2,150 to 2,950 |

== Gallery ==
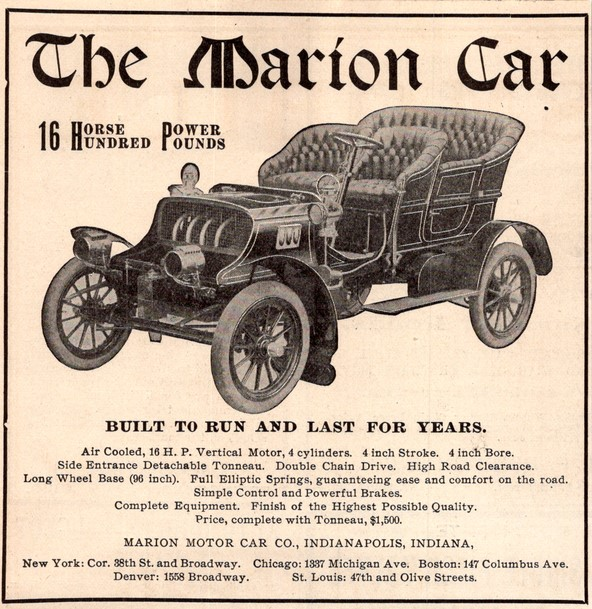
1905 Marion Model Four Advertisement

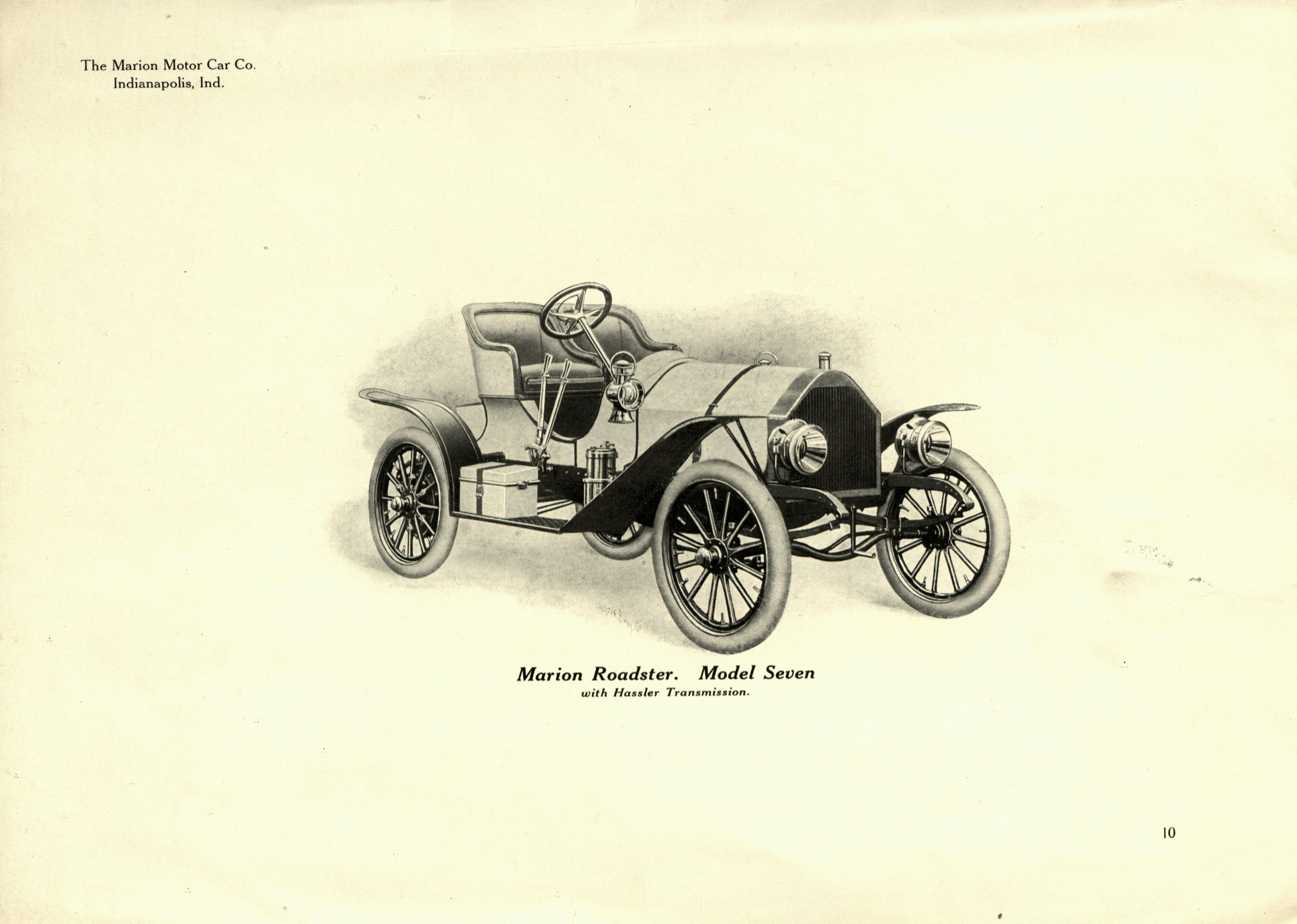
1911 Marion Model Seven Roadster

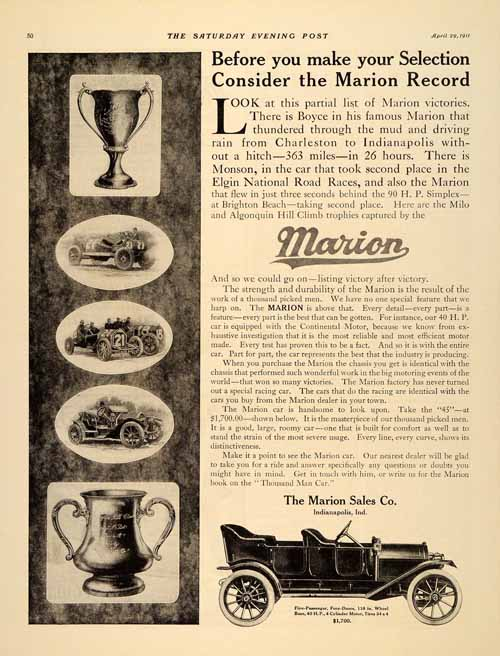
1911 Marion "Victories" Advertisement

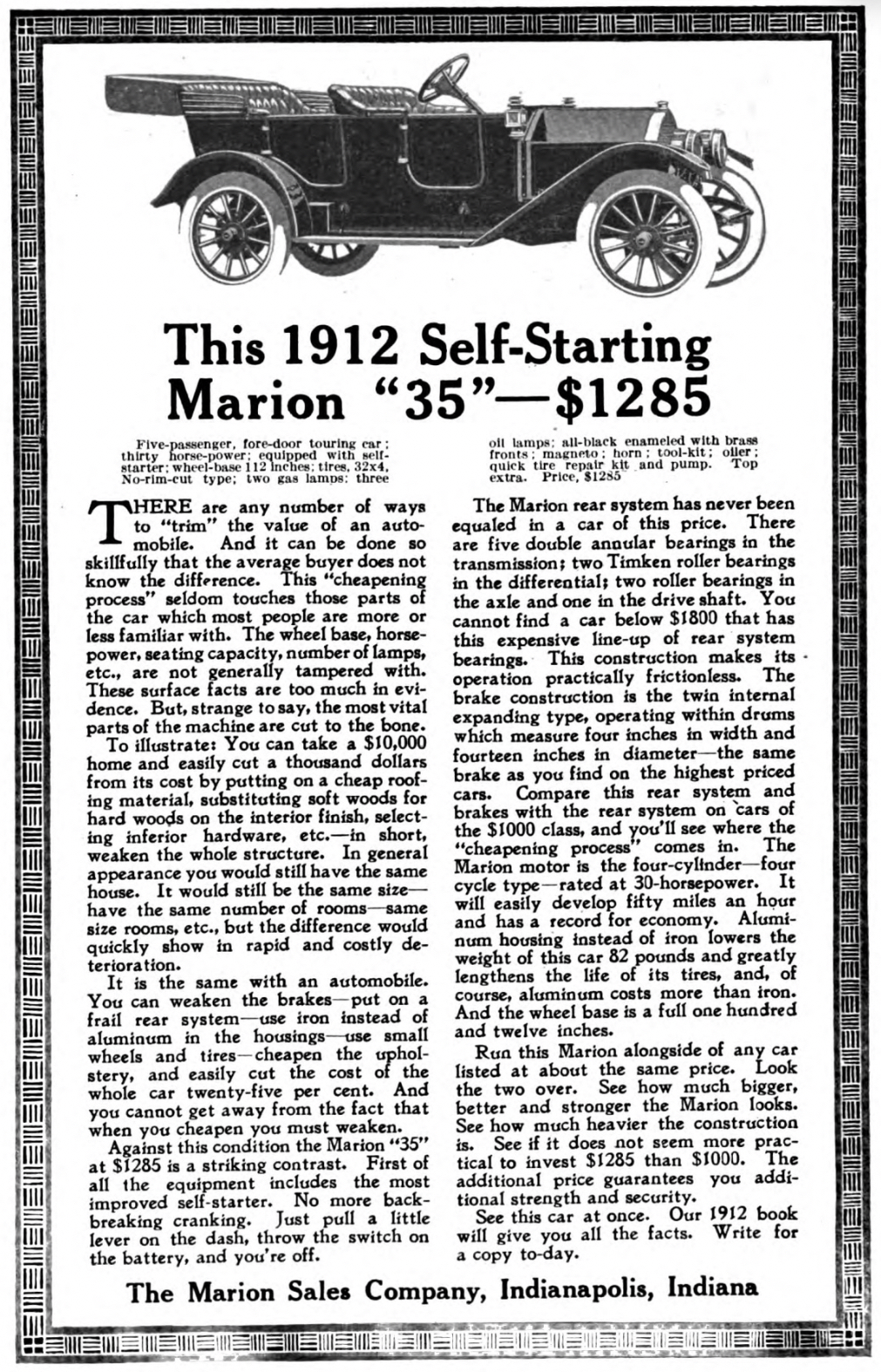
Marion advertisement (1912)

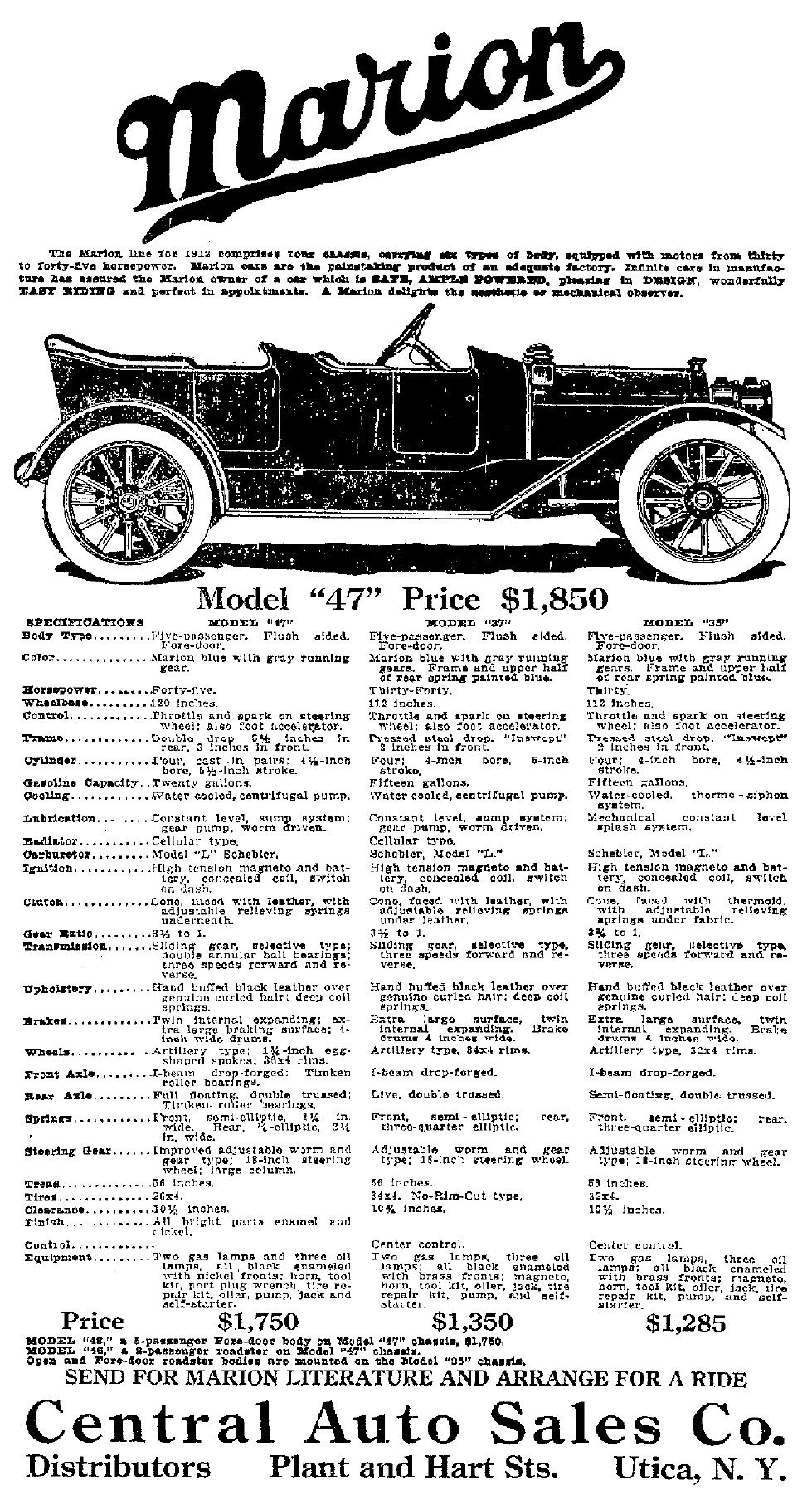
Marion advertisement (1912)

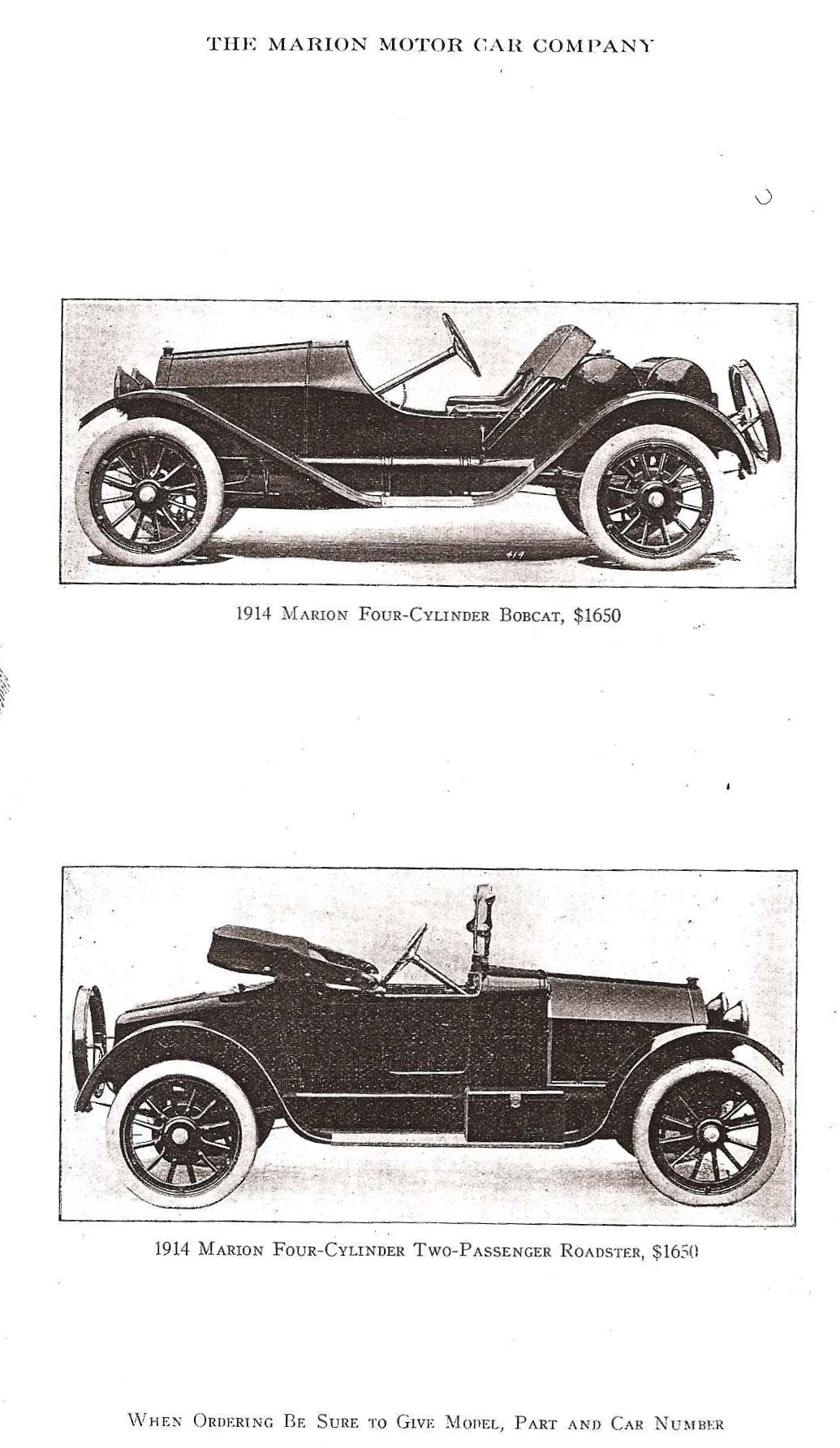
1914 Marion Bobcat & Roadster Brochure

== See also ==
- List of defunct automobile manufacturers
- Marion Bobcat Speedsters at ConceptCarz
- Marion Motor Car Company - Notes from the Indiana Archives
- 1912 Marion Bobcat Speedster - Hemmings Article
