= ERL (automobile manufacturer) =

Automobile manufacturer from Mölndal, Sweden

ERL, from the initials of its creator Eskil Roland Lindström, was an automobile manufacturer from Mölndal, Sweden. Lindström was a race driver during the mid-war period, and after World War II he built a series of nine sports cars made out of parts from motorcycles and standard cars. The first engine came from a Douglas motorcycle; later it was replaced by a 600 cc two-stroke DKW engine giving 14.5 HP. It was connected to a three-speed gearbox mounted in the middle of the car. The grille came from a Ford Model B, but lowered. Many of the chassis parts came from the BMW Dixi, a German copy of Austin Seven. The car was very light, only 520 kg and the top speed was 100 km/h.
