= Ralph Earle =

Ralph Earle may refer to:

- Ralph Earle (ambassador) (1928–2020), American diplomat and arms control negotiator
- Ralph Earle (American naval officer) (1874–1939), American naval officer
- Ralph Earle (politician) (1835–1879), British politician
- Ralph Earle Jr. (1908–1995), American biblical scholar

== See also ==
- Ralph Earl (1751–1801), American artist
- Ralph Eleaser Whiteside Earl (1780s–1838), his son, American painter
