= Sarah H. Earle =

American Quaker, abolitionist, and women's rights activist (1799–1858)

Sarah Hussey Earle (August 26, 1799 – March 9, 1858) was an abolitionist, American Quaker, and women's rights activist. She was born in Nantucket, Massachusetts and married John Milton Earle on June 6, 1821, before moving to Worcester, Massachusetts. She founded the Worcester Ladies Anti-Slavery Sewing Circle and served as its president in 1839. She assisted and served on committees of the Worcester County Anti-Slavery Society, South Division from 1841 and was the first woman to serve as one of the vice presidents of the South Division before her death in 1858. Additionally, Earle coordinated Worcester anti-slavery fairs from 1848 and organized fundraising for the American Anti-Slavery Society, eventually sending donations to Maria Weston Chapman. She founded and was president of the Worcester City Anti-Slavery Society, in addition to organizing lectures for the organization. She gave the opening address to the first National Women's Rights Convention, which was held in Worcester, Massachusetts, in 1850, and was elected president of the 1854 New England Women's Rights Convention in Boston.

Her political activities also included petitioning; she signed a petition for women's suffrage sent to the Massachusetts legislature in 1851, and lead a petition to strike the word "males" from the Massachusetts Constitution, which was sent to the Massachusetts legislature in 1855. Earle was also involved in the Worcester County Temperance Convention and was a reader and supporter of Paulina Kellogg Wright Davis's periodical, The Una.

Eight of her nine children survived infancy.
