= Erle Elsworth Clippinger =

American writer (1875–1939)

- Born: September 27, 1875
- Died: January 7, 1939 (aged 63)
- Occupation: Professor of English
- Period: 19th–20th century

Erle Elsworth Clippinger (September 27, 1875 – January 7, 1939) was an American writer, professor of English, and a scholar of children's literature in Indiana. He was one of the founding faculty members at Ball State University, where he chaired the English department for many years.

== Early life and education ==
Clippinger was born on September 27, 1875, in Eau Claire, Michigan, to mother Mary Edna and father Henry G. Clippinger, who worked as a medical doctor. He graduated from Michigan State Normal College (now Eastern Michigan University) in 1900, and went on to the University of Michigan, where he earned a bachelor's degree in 1903 and a master's degree in 1904. He also briefly attended graduate school at Harvard University.

== Career and later life ==
He became an assistant professor at the Indiana State Normal School (now Indiana State University) in 1904. He moved to Ball State College in 1918, newly reopened after a previous school on the same site closed and the site was donated to the state of Indiana. He was the first teacher hired at the new school, and became head of its English department.

He wrote the first catalog of the school's curriculum and, ignoring the Indiana government's requirement that the newly founded school focus only on preparing students to become primary-school teachers, developed a curriculum that covered both primary and secondary-level education. At Ball State, Clippinger was "an effective, challenging instructor" but had difficult relations with some other faculty members. He stepped down as department chair in 1932. He retired in 1937 and was awarded emeritus professor the same year. Clippinger died on January 7, 1939, in Muncie, Indiana.

== Books ==
Clippinger's published works include Children's Literature: A Textbook of Sources for Teachers and Teacher-Training Classes (with Charles Madison Curry, Rand McNally 1921), Illustrated Lessons in Composition and Rhetoric (Silver, Burdett, and Co. 1912), and the two volume text Written and Spoken English: A Course in Composition and Rhetoric (Silver, Burdett, and Co. 1917). Written and Spoken English was widely used as a high school textbook, and Children's Literature enjoyed a second edition in 1932.

=== Reception ===
Author Michael Carter, in his 2003 book Where Writing Begins: A PostModern Reconstruction, described Clippinger's Written and Spoken English as a "classic" that is "an early example" of writing textbooks centered on "correct written presentation and correct grammar".

Clippinger's book Written and Spoken English was "widely used in Chinese junior and senior colleges," wrote Xiaoye You in his book Writing in the Devil's Tongue: A History of English Composition in China.
