= Erle, Astrakhan Oblast =

Erle Эрле
- Settlement
- Location within Astrakhan Oblast Location within Russia
- Coordinates: 46°12′N 48°02′E
- Country: Russia
- Region: Astrakhan Oblast
- District: Privolzhsky District
- Time zone: UTC+4:00

Erle (Russian: Эрле) is a rural locality (a settlement) in Yaksatovsky Selsoviet, Privolzhsky District, Astrakhan Oblast, Russia. The population was 79 in 2010. There are three streets.

== Geography ==
Erle is located on the Kigach River, 36 km southwest of Nachalovo (the district's administrative centre) by road. Atal is the nearest rural locality.
