= Erle Bartley =

American academic

Erle E. Bartley (October 23, 1922 – February 10, 1983) was an Agricultural Science Professor at Kansas State University from 1949 until his death in 1983. He was known for his many agricultural inventions, especially those regarding ruminal tympany (ruminant bloat) problems. He invented the bloat preventative poloxalene, also known as "Bloat Guard".

== Early life ==
Erle Bartley was born October 23, 1922, in Bangalore, India to British parents. He completed his early education in India and England, before moving to Iowa State University where he earned his M.S. in 1946 and his Ph.D. in 1949 under Dr. Emerson Bird. Immediately after his Ph.D. he took a position at Kansas State University, where he worked until his death.

== Career ==
Bartley's research focused on ruminant bloat, legume bloat, and the utilization of ammonia in the rumen. He was best known for his work on preventative treatments for ruminant bloat, including poloxalene and the antibiotic lasalocid. He also researched ammonia toxicity in ruminants as well as the interactions between carbohydrates and urea in the ruminant digestive system.

== Death ==
He suffered a fatal heart attack in his office on February 10, 1983.

== Honors ==
Bartley was awarded various honors in his field of agricultural science. These include the American Feed Manufacturers' Award for Dairy Cattle Nutrition (1957), the Kansas State University Outstanding Graduate Faculty Research Award (1963 to 1964), the Gamma Sigma Delta Distinguished Faculty Award (1970), the Kansas Interbreed Dairy Cattle Council's Dairy Leader Award (1975), the Borden Award for Dairy Cattle Nutrition Research (1975), the National Agri-Marketing Association's Award for Agricultural Excellence in Science (1981), the Morrison Award presented by the American Society of Animal Science (1981), and the Phi Kappa Phi Scholar Award (1982).
