= George Earl =

George Earl is the name of:

- George Earl (painter) (1824–1908), English painters
- George Earl (cricketer) (1859–1933), English cricketer
- George Windsor Earl (1813–1865), English navigator, ethnographer
- George Earl (1946–2003), musician, also known as George Faith
- George Earl Maney (1826–1901), American soldier, politician, railroad executive and diplomat
- George Earl Ortman (1926–2015), American painter, printmaker, constructionist and sculptor

== See also ==
- George Earle (disambiguation)
