= Eorl =

Eorl may refer to:

- Eorl Crabtree (born 1982), an English rugby league player
- an Anglo-Saxon title of nobility, see Earl

== See also ==
- Cirion and Eorl (or Cirion and Eorl and the Friendship of Gondor and Rohan), one of the Unfinished Tales by J. R. R. Tolkien
- Erilaz, in the Proto-Norse language
