= Earl Township =

Earl Township may refer to:

- Earl Township, LaSalle County, Illinois
- Earl Township, Berks County, Pennsylvania
- Earl Township, Lancaster County, Pennsylvania

== See also ==
- East Earl Township, Lancaster County, Pennsylvania
- West Earl Township, Pennsylvania
