= Jarl (name) =

Jarl is a name of Scandinavian origin. Notable people with the name include:

== As a given name ==
- Jarl-Thure Eriksson (born 1944), Finnish scientist
- Jarl Kulle (1927–1997), Swedish actor and director
- Jarl Lander (1944–2014), Swedish politician
- Jarl-André Storbæk (born 1978), Norwegian football player
- Jarl Wahlström (1918–1999), 12th General of The Salvation Army
- Jarl Espen Ygranes (born 1979), Norwegian ice hockey player

== As a surname ==
- Sofia Jarl (born 1977), Swedish politician
- Stefan Jarl (born 1941), Swedish film director
