= Mortimer Lamson Earle =

American classical scholar (1864–1905)

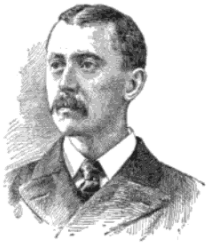
- Born: October 14, 1864; New York, New York
- Died: September 26, 1905 (aged 40); New York, New York
- Education: Columbia University; University of Bonn; American School of Classical Studies at Athens
- Occupation: Classical scholar
- Spouse: Ethel Deodata Woodward (m. 1892)

Mortimer Lamson Earle, Ph. D. (1864–1905) was an American classical scholar.

== Biography ==
He was born in New York City on October 14, 1864, the only child of Mortimer Lent Earle and Mercy Josephine Allen. He received his early education from Ashland Public School in East Orange, New Jersey, and through private tutors, and was educated at Columbia College of Columbia University, receiving his doctorate from Columbia University in 1889. He studied at the University of Bonn and the American School of Classical Studies at Athens in the period from 1887 to 1889. At the latter in 1887 he was placed in charge of the excavations of the site of ancient Sikyon by Professor Augustus C. Merriam of Columbia. On June 4, 1892, he married Ethel Deodata Woodward (1864–1940). They had no children.

From 1889 to 1895 he was instructor in Greek at Barnard College and Columbia University. From 1895 to 1898 he served as associate professor in Greek and Latin at Bryn Mawr College, before returning to Barnard in 1898 just as it was about to become part of Columbia University. He was appointed professor of classical philology in 1899. In 1890 he was appointed a member of the American Philological Association and served as vice-president from 1902 until his death in 1905. He edited Euripides' Alcestis (1895); Sophocles' Œdipus Tyrannus (1900); and Euripides' Medea (1904). His numerous contributions to learned periodicals were collected in The Classical Papers of Mortimer Lamson Earle, with a Memoir (New York, 1912). He died on September 26, 1905, in New York from typhoid fever contracted whilst in Sicily.

After his death, his students and friends gave his library to his alma mater, Columbia University.
