= Josh Earl =

Josh Earl may refer to:

- Josh Earl (comedian)
- Josh Earl (footballer)
