= Nathan Earle =

Nathan Earle may refer to:

- Nathan Earle (cyclist)
- Nathan Earle (rugby union)
