= Giles Earle (musician) =

Giles Earle (fl. 1615) was an English collector of songs, and assumed poet and composer, now known for his manuscript collection Giles Earle his Booke dated 1615. Songs from it were set to music by Peter Warlock.
