= Lend Me Your Ears =

Lend Me Your Ears may refer to:

- "Friends, Romans, countrymen, lend me your ears", the first line of speech by Mark Antony in William Shakespeare's play Julius Caesar
- Lend Me Your Ears (Jeremy Steig, Eddie Gómez and Joe Chambers album), 1978
- Lend Me Your Ears (Ray Stevens album), 1990
- Lend Me Your Ears (book), a 2003 book by Boris Johnson
- Lend Me Your Ears (video series), a 2014 video series by John Cantlie
