= Michael Earl =

Michael Earl is the name of:

- Michael Earl (puppeteer) (1959–2015), American puppeteer, actor, writer, singer and songwriter
- Michael Earl (academic) (born 1944), dean of Templeton College, Oxford and professor of information management
