= Earls (restaurant chain) =

Canadian Premium-Casual Restaurant Chain

Earls Restaurants Ltd
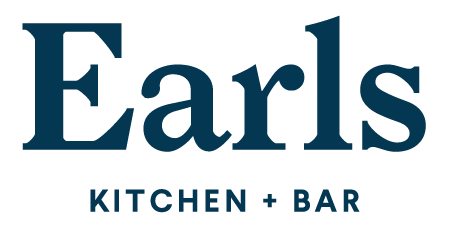
- Type: Private
- Industry: Restaurant
- Genre: Premium Casual
- Founded: 1982; 44 years ago
- Founder: Leroy Earl Fuller, Stanley Earl Fuller
- Headquarters: 234 W 3rd Ave Level 4, Vancouver, British Columbia
- Number of locations: 70+
- Areas served: Canada, United States
- Revenue: $250 million (2014)
- Net income: n/a
- Number of employees: 9,000 (2025)
- Website: earls.ca

Earls Kitchen + Bar is an upscale casual restaurant group that operates a total of 70+ locations across Canada and the United States. Their head office is in Vancouver, British Columbia, Canada.

== History ==
=== Overview ===
Earls Kitchen + Bar is an upscale casual restaurant group with 70+ locations across North America. The company is privately held and was founded in 1982 in Edmonton, Alberta, by father-and-son duo Bus Fuller and Stanley Earl Fuller. Built by passionate restaurateurs obsessed with every part of the guest experience and recognized as a pioneer in the ‘Premium Casual Dining’ segment in Canada, Earls is dedicated to providing unforgettable dining experiences through a sophisticated atmosphere and confidently charming service, ensuring every guest feels truly cared for.

== Menu ==
Its menu is Modern American with global inspiration, focusing on "big on flavour" dishes made with premium ingredients. Signature items include prime-grade steaks, the Seafood Tower and popular dishes like the Queen Bee Pizza, Spicy Calabrian Pasta and Santa Fe Chicken Salad. Earls is famous for its Happy Hour, expertly crafted cocktails, and signature margaritas.

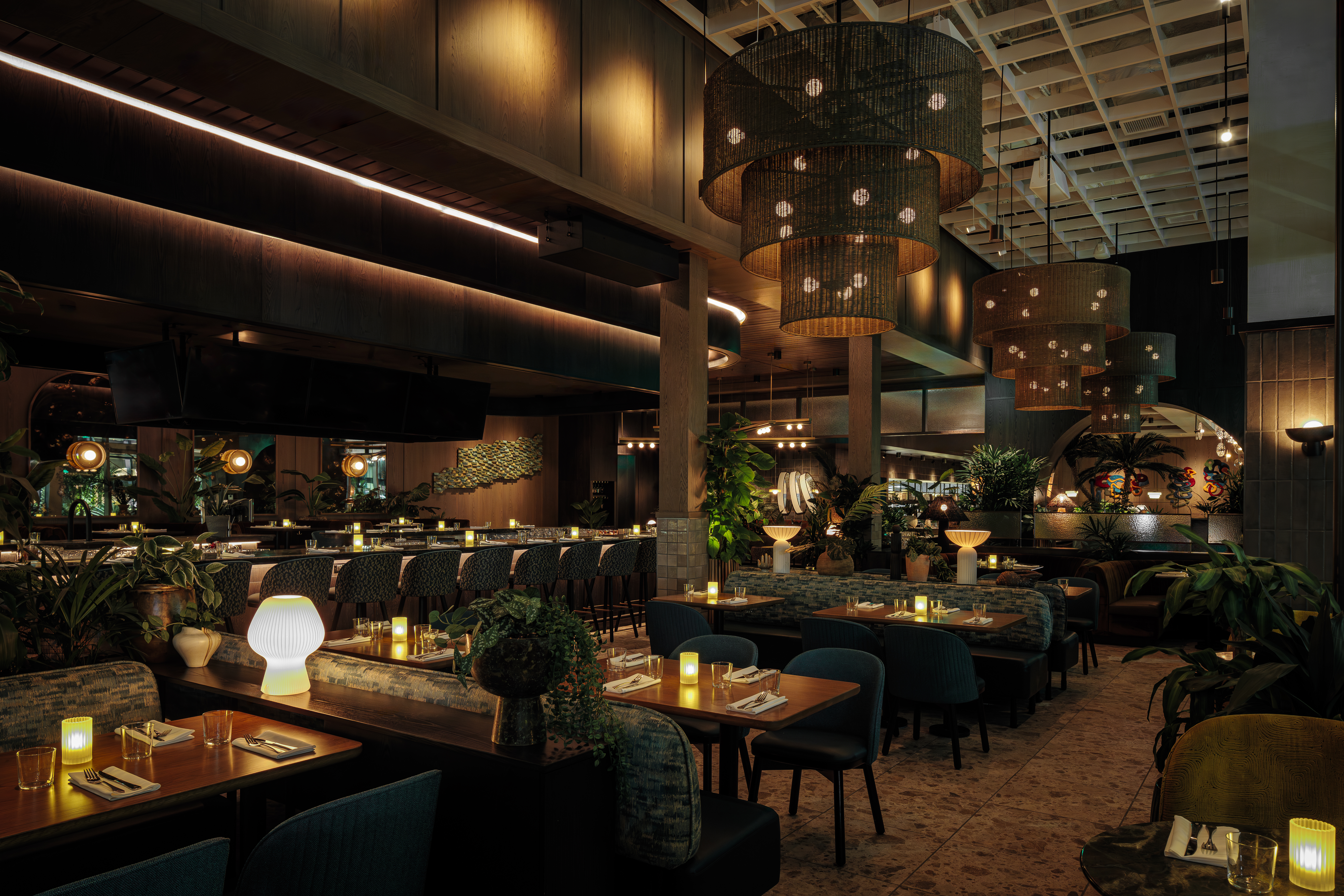

== People ==
The company fosters a "People Grow Here" culture, which has led to approximately 7,000 employees building long-term careers, often starting young and staying for life.

== Expansion ==
Earls is currently in a phase of expansion, notably in U.S. markets and prominent destinations. Earls highlights "With the opening of two incredible locations in Florida, Waikiki (opened October 2025), Nashville (opened Spring 2026), and we couldn’t be happier to bring a third Earls location to Boston (early 2027)." The company describes its approach as “unchaining the chain,” focusing on creating a collection of individually designed restaurants, each tailored to its local community.

Earls plans further expansion across North America, with Boston projected to open in early 2027 with more announcements expected soon.

== Recognition ==
The brand's South Florida locations are recognized by OpenTable as among the top ten most booked restaurants in Miami and Fort Lauderdale (2025).

Stanley Fuller has received several industry honors, including Business in Vancouver’s BC CEO of the Year (2019) and inclusion in Vancouver Magazine’s Power 50 Hall of Fame (2024). Bus Fuller (1928–2019) and Stan Fuller were jointly inducted into the Business Laureates of British Columbia Hall of Fame (2025).

== See also ==
- List of Canadian restaurant chains
- Joey (restaurant)
- Cactus Club Cafe
