= Rabbit Ears =

Rabbit ears are the ears of a rabbit. Rabbit Ears or Rabbit ears may also refer to:

== Places ==
- Rabbit Ears (Clayton, New Mexico), twin mountain peaks that are a National Historic Landmark
- Rabbit Ears Pass in Colorado
- Rabbit Ears Range in the Rocky Mountains in Colorado

== Arts, entertainment, and media ==
- Rabbit Ears Productions, an animation company for children's stories
- Rabbit Ears, an episode of the American animated sitcom American Dad!.

== Science and technology ==
- Rabbit ears, a colloquial term for a set-top TV antenna
- Rabbit ears, a vernacular name for the bunny ears cactus, Opuntia microdasys
- Rabbit ears, a vernacular name for the fungus Wynnea americana

== See also ==
- Bunny ears (disambiguation)
