= Bunny ears (disambiguation) =

Bunny ears (Opuntia microdasys) is a species of cactus.

Bunny ears may also refer to:

- Double figure-eight loop, a multi-loop knot
- Set-top tv antenna, a common dipole antenna
- V sign, a hand gesture behind another person's head giving the impression of "ears" or "horns"
- the ears of a chocolate bunny, or chocolate molded as the ears only

== See also ==
- Rabbit Ears (disambiguation)
