= Felix Earle =

Diné (Navajo) fashion designer, lapidary artist and farmer

Felix Earle is a Diné (Navajo) fashion designer, lapidary artist and Indigenous food-security farmer. He lives on the Navajo Nation land (Dinétah) in Ganado, Arizona.

He is of the Tó Dích’íi’nii (Bitter Water clan), born for the Tábąąhí (Waters Edge clan), maternal grandfather is Tsi’naajinii (The Black Streak Running into the Water clan), and paternal grandfather is Dibé Łizhiní (Black Sheep clan).

== Early life ==
Earle grew up in a family that farmed from the 1970s until 1985. Life changed in his community when the University of New Mexico opened a satellite campus in Gallup, New Mexico. Because all the adults in his family began attending university after 1985, their farming activity and livestock tapered off, and eventually ended. However their fields, left fallow, remained associated with their family. His grandmother, Helen, safely stored some of the seed stock. It is on this property, belonging to his grandparents, that Earle began his own gardening and farming activities.

== Work ==
=== Fashion design ===
Earle began designing clothing in 1996 when he produced a line of traditional Navajo clothing. His fashion label is Earle Couture that produces custom designed clothing. He believes that fashion has an effect on "society's psychology." His designs are often made from "rich, heavy, saturated fabrics such as lace, velvet, satins and brocades" and prefers natural fibers such as wool, silk and cotton. He does not mass-produce his work, the vast majority (90% of sales) are special ordered and custom made. Earle has also used his tailoring skills for community service. During the COVID-19 pandemic Earle joined with the Warrior Protectors, a group of fellow Native American fashion designers who sewed and distributed protective masks widely and uploaded tutorials on mask-making to the internet.

=== Red Earth Gardens ===
Earle is a farmer who advocates for Indigenous food security; he provides gardeners with advisement on the use of Indigenous seed stock for growing food crops. He began to farm using "Grandma Helen's Corn" from a handful of heritage seeds that his grandmother stored for 35 years. It is a variety of white corn. Later he founded Red Earth Gardens, and distributed kernels of this variety of corn to other tribal members.

During the COVID-19 pandemic, the Navajo people were significantly affected by the virus. Earle distributed so much corn during the pandemic that he ran out for the first time. Of this he states, "It took a deadly virus to make people realize just how important this is, how important it is to grow your own food." He and fellow gardener Nate Etsitty labored together to rehabilitate the soil at Red Point Farms, with support from the Black Mesa Water Coalition, a not-for-profit agency.

=== Jewelry ===
Earle's line of stone and shell heishi jewelry is sold under the name of Earle Couture Jewelry.
