= Earle =

Earle may refer to:

- Earle (given name)
- Earle (surname)

== Places ==
- Earle, Arkansas, a city in Crittenden County, Arkansas, US
- Earle, Indiana, an unincorporated town in Vanderburgh County, Indiana, US
- Earle, Northumberland, a settlement in Berwick-upon-Tweed, Northumberland, England
- Naval Weapons Station Earle, a US Navy base on Sandy Hook Bay in New Jersey

== See also ==
- Earl
- Earles (disambiguation)
