= List of unit testing frameworks =

This is a list of notable test automation frameworks commonly used for unit testing. Such frameworks are not limited to unit-level testing; they can be used for integration and system level testing.

Frameworks are grouped below. For unit testing, a framework must be the same language as the source code under test, and therefore, grouping frameworks by language is valuable. But some groupings transcend language. For example, .NET groups frameworks that work for any language supported for .NET, and HTTP groups frameworks that test an HTTP server regardless of the implementation language on the server.

== Columns ==
The columns in the tables below are described here.

- Name: Name of the framework
- xUnit: Whether classified as xUnit
- TAP: Whether can emit Test Anything Protocol (TAP) output
- Generators: Whether supports data generators – generating test input data and running a test with the generated data
- Fixtures: Whether supports test local fixtures – associating a test environment with a single test
- Group fixtures: Whether supports group fixtures – associating a test environment with a group of tests

Some columns do not apply to some groupings and are therefore omitted from that groupings table.

== Groups ==
=== ABAP ===
Name	xUnit	Source	Remarks
ABAP Unit	Yes		since SAP NetWeaver 2004
TEST.easy			since SAP NetWeaver 7.02 SP13

=== Active Server Pages (ASP) ===
Name	xUnit	Source	Remarks
ASPUnit			

=== Ada ===
Name	xUnit	Source	Remarks
AUnit	Yes		
AdaTEST 95	No		
Ahven			
TBrun			
VectorCAST/Ada	No		
RTRT			

=== Ant ===
For Apache Ant tasks.

Name	xUnit	Source	Remarks
AntUnit			

=== AppleScript ===
For AppleScript.

Name	xUnit	Source	Remarks
ASUnit	Yes		influenced by SUnit, ASTest and Python unittest
ASTest	Yes		

=== ASCET ===
Name	xUnit	Source	Remarks
TPT	Yes		Model based physical stimulation and implemented stimulation

=== Bash ===
Name	xUnit	Source	Remarks
shUnit2	Yes		an xUnit unit test framework for Bourne-based shell scripts
bats-core			Bats-Core: Bash Automated Testing System
ShellSpec			BDD style unit testing framework. Supports all POSIX compliant shells including Bash, Dash, Ksh and Zsh. Nestable blocks that realize local scope and easy mocking. Parallel execution. RSpec-like/TAP/JUnit XML Reporter. Code coverage integration. MIT license.
bash_unit			bash unit testing enterprise edition framework. GPL-3.0 License.
bach			Bach is a testing framework for Bash that provides the possibility to write unit tests for your Bash scripts.

=== BASIC ===
==== Visual Basic (VB6.0) ====
For unit testing frameworks for VB.NET, see .NET languages.

Name	xUnit	License	Source	Remarks
vbUnit		Commercial		Visual Basic and COM objects
vbUnitFree		LGPL		Visual Basic and COM objects
VbaUnit		BSD		Visual Basic for Applications
ExcelVbaUnit		LGPL		Similar to VbaUnit, but specifically for testing Excel VBA (written as an Excel add-in)
TinyUnit				Visual Basic 6, VB .NET, and PHP5
SimplyVBUnit	Yes	MIT		VB6 Unit Testing Framework modeled after the popular NUnit for .NET
VBLiteUnit		BSD		Visual Basic and COM objects

==== Xojo (REALbasic) ====
Name	xUnit	Source	Remarks
RBUnit	No		
XojoUnit	Yes		Unit testing framework for Xojo that works with Desktop, Web and iOS project types.

=== Business Process Execution Language (BPEL) ===
Name	xUnit	Source	Remarks
BPELUnit			

=== C ===
Name	xUnit	TAP	Fixtures	Group fixtures	Generators	Year	Source	License	Remarks
AceUnit	Yes		Yes			2007		BSD license	Is JUnit 4.x style, easy, modular and flexible. It can be used in resource constrained environments, e.g., embedded software development, and PCs, workstations, servers (Windows and Unix).
AcuTest	Yes	Yes						MIT	Simple, straightforward, fast. Single .h file. Used in the Apache Portable Runtime Library. Renamed from CUTest.
API Sanity Checker	Yes		Yes (spectypes)	Yes (spectypes)	Yes	2009		LGPL	Unit test generator for C/C++ libraries. Can automatically generate reasonable input data for every API function.
Automated Testing Framework						2007		BSD	Originally developed for the NetBSD operating system but works well in most Unix-like platforms. Ability to install tests as part of a release.
BDD-for-C		Yes						MIT	BDD test framework with TAP output in a single header file.
Cantata++	No		Yes	Yes	Yes			Proprietary	Automated unit and integration testing tool for C. Certified testing for host or embedded systems. Code coverage and unique call interface control to simulate and intercept calls.
Catsrunner								GPL	Unit testing framework for cross-platform embedded development.
CBDD			Yes	Yes				Apache License	libcbdd is a block-based Behavior-driven development library which allows for very readable tests. Tests are written inside main functions. Works only with clang and the libblocksruntime extension.
cfix	Yes							LGPL	Specialized for Windows development—both Win32 and NT kernel mode. Compatible to WinUnit.
Cgreen			Yes					ISC	Unit test framework including strict and loose mocks, auto-discovering of tests, suites, BDD-ish style notation, test protected against exceptions, "natural language" output, extensible reporter, learning mocks to discover actual values sent to a mock.
CHEAT			Yes			2012		BSD	Header-only unit testing framework. Multi-platform. Supports running each test in a separate process. Works without needing to "register" test cases.
Check	Yes	Yes	Yes	Yes		2001		LGPL	Check features a simple interface for defining unit tests, putting little in the way of the developer. Tests are run in a separate process, so Check can catch both assertion failures and code errors that cause segmentation faults or other signals. The output from unit tests can be used within source code editors and IDEs. Can output to multiple formats, like the TAP format, JUnit XML or SubUnit. Supports Linux, macOS, FreeBSD, Windows.
Cmocka	Yes	Yes	Yes	Yes		2012		Apache License 2.0	CMocka is a test framework for C with support for mock objects. It's easy to use and setup. CMocka is forked from and a successor to cmockery, which was developed by Google but has been unmaintained for some time. Can output to multiple formats, like the TAP format, JUnit XML, or SubUnit.
Cmockery	Yes					2008		Apache License 2.0	Google sponsored project.
CppUTest	Yes		Yes	No	Yes			3-clause BSD	Limited C++ set by design to keep usage easy and allow it to work on embedded platforms. C++ is buried in macros so the learning curve for C programmers is minimal. Ported to Symbian. Has a mocking support library CppUMock
Criterion	Yes	Yes	Yes	Yes	Yes			MIT	Unit testing framework with automatic test registration. Supports theories and parameterized tests. Each test is run in its own process, so signals and crashes can be reported. Can output to multiple formats, like the TAP format or JUnit XML. Supports Linux, macOS, FreeBSD, Windows.
CU								3-clause BSD	CU is a simple unit testing framework for handling automated tests in C.
CTest	Yes		Yes	Yes				Apache License 2.0	Ctest is a framework with some special features: formatted output for easy parsing, easy to use.
CUnit	Yes					2001		LGPL	OS independent (Windows, Linux, macOS, Solaris, HP-UX, AIX and probably others)
CUnit (CUnity Fork)	Yes					2018		LGPL	Forked from CUnit in 2018 to provide ongoing development and support. OS independent (Windows, Linux, macOS, Solaris, HP-UX, AIX and probably others). Also supports output compatible with JUnit and in most cases can be a drop in replacement for CUnit.
CUnitWin32	Yes							LGPL	For Win32. Minimalistic framework. Executes each test as a separate process.
CUT	No							BSD	
Cutter	Yes							LGPL	A Unit Testing Framework for C.
EmbeddedUnit	Yes		Yes			2003		MIT	Embedded C
Embunit	No							Proprietary	Create unit tests for C/C++ and Embedded C++
FCTX	Yes							BSD	Fast and complete unit testing framework all in one header. Declare and write your functions in one step. No dependencies. Cross-platform.
GLib Testing	Yes		Yes						Part of GLib
GUnit									for GNOME
Hammocking			Yes		Yes			MIT	Creates gmocks for C code . Also creates custom code. Usecase: Testing of legacy code
lcut	Yes		Yes	Yes				Apache License 2.0	a Lightweight C Unit Testing framework, including mock support
libcester	Yes	Yes	Yes	No	Yes			MIT	A robust header only unit testing framework, for C and C++. Supports function mocking, memory leak detection, crash report. Works on various platforms including embedded systems and compatible with various compilers. Outputs to multiple format like TAP, JunitXML, TAPV13 or plain text.
LibU	Yes		No					BSD	multiplatform (Unix, Windows); explicit test case/suite dependencies; parallel and sandboxed execution; xml, txt and customizable report formatting.
Mimicc								Proprietary	Fully automated mock generation for C and C++. Based on clang, provides the ability to compile header files straight into linkable mock object files and control them with an accompanying API.
MinUnit								MIT	extreme minimalist unit testing using 2 C macros
Mut	No		No	No	No			MIT	Another minimalistic framework for C and Unix. Single header file.
Nala								MIT	Powerful mocking. Clean API.
NovaProva	Yes		Yes	Yes	Yes			Apache License 2.0	Unit testing framework with automatic test registration. Supports mocking and stubbing. Each test is run in parallel with valgrind in its own process, so memory errors and signals can be caught. Supports Linux.
Opmock	Yes		Yes	Yes	Yes			GPLv3	Stubbing and mocking framework for C and C++ based on code generation from headers. Can check call parameters, call sequence, handle multiple implementations of a mock, and more. Includes as well a small unit testing framework, with JUnit compatible XML output, but works also with any unit testing framework.
Parasoft C/C++test	Yes		Yes	Yes	Yes			Proprietary	Automated unit/component test generation and execution on host or embedded systems with code coverage and runtime error detection. Also provides static analysis and peer code review.
PicoTest	Yes		Yes	Yes				3-clause BSD	PicoTest is a single-file unit testing framework for C programs that follows the xUnit principles. It provides a CMake module definition for easier integration with other CMake projects.
RCUNIT	Yes		Yes	Yes				MIT	RCUNIT is a small framework for testing C programs. It uses non-local jumps to emulate exceptions and handles program terminating signals (e.g. SIGILL) during test runs. RCUNIT allows creation of test fixtures, either per test or per test group.
Rexo	Yes	No	Yes	Yes	No			Public domain	Framework for C89/C++ featuring automatic registration of tests and a polished API.
RK Test	Yes							Public domain	A single-header unit testing library closely mimicking Google Test, featuring self registering tests.
RTRT								Proprietary	
SeaTest	Yes		Yes					MIT	Simple, pure C, unit testing framework
Smarttester								Proprietary	Automated unit and integration testing, and code coverage
Sput								2-clause BSD	Simple, portable C unit testing framework, single header file
STRIDE	Yes		Yes	Yes	No			Proprietary	Embedded software quality solution that includes techniques for unit, API, Behavior & Integration testing as well as interactive reporting portal
TBrun					Yes			Proprietary	Automated unit and integration testing, and code coverage Generators available across another component named TBExtreme
Tau	Yes	Yes	Yes	Yes	Yes			MIT	A Micro Unit testing framework for C/C++. At ~1k lines of code, it is simpler, lighter and much faster than heavier frameworks like Googletest and Catch2. Includes a rich set of assertion macros, supports automatic test registration and can output to multiple formats, like the TAP format or JUnit XML. Supports Linux, macoOS, FreeBSD, Windows.
TESSY								Proprietary	Automated unit and integration testing, and code coverage focused on embedded systems
TestApe									Test and mocking framework. Automatic default mocks for unresolved externals
Test Dept.	Yes							GPL	Can modify calls from software under test; e.g. test error conditions by stubbing malloc and letting it return null. Well documented
TF unit test	Yes		Yes			2012		GNU Lesser GPL	Pure C, supports test isolation in separate processes
Theft					Yes	2014		ISC	C library for property-based testing.
tinytest			Yes					Apache	Standalone, no dependencies, header-only.
TPT	Yes		Yes	Yes	Yes			Proprietary	Time Partition Testing: Automated model based unit and integration testing for embedded systems. For C code under test, TPT supports automatic test frame generation including automatic interface analysis as well as automatic test execution, evaluation and logging.
Unity	Yes				Yes			MIT	Lightweight and includes features for embedded development. Can work with Mocks and Exceptions via CMock and CException. Also integrated with test build environment Ceedling.
usfstl	Yes		Yes					BSD	User Space Firmware Simulation Testing Library. built on top of C Unit Testing framework, which allows mocking of any symbol in runtime to multiple implementations.
VectorCAST/C	No		Yes	Yes	Yes			Proprietary	Automated unit and integration testing, and code coverage
Visual Assert	Yes								Unit-Testing Add-In for Visual Studio. Based on the cfix testing framework.
qc					Yes			FreeBSD	qc is a C port of the QuickCheck unit test framework
xTests								BSD	Depends on STLSoft C & C++ Libraries

=== C# ===
See .NET languages below.

=== C++ ===
Name	License	xUnit	Fixtures	Group fixtures	Generators	Mocks	Exceptions	Macros	Templates	Grouping	Source	Remarks
Aeryn		No	Yes	Yes	No	No	Yes	Yes	Yes	Yes		
API Sanity Checker	GNU LGPL	Yes	Yes (spectypes)	Yes (spectypes)	Yes							Unit test generator for C/C++ libraries. Can automatically generate reasonable input data for every API function. LGPL.
ATF	BSD						Yes	Yes	Yes	Yes		Originally developed for the NetBSD operating system but works well in most Unix-like platforms. Ability to install tests as part of a release.
Bandit	MIT	No (describe/it)	Yes (describe)	Yes (Nested describe)	No	No	Yes	Yes	No	Yes (Nested describe)		Header only. Automatic test registration. Specifically developed for C++11
Boost Test Library	Boost	Yes	Yes	Yes	Yes	With additional library "Turtle"	Yes	User decision	Yes	Suites and labels		Part of Boost. Powerful dataset concept for generating test cases. Different levels of fixtures (global, once per test suite, once per each test case in a suite). Powerful floating point comparison.
BugEye	Boost	No	No	No	No	No	Yes	No	No	Yes		Header-only. TAP output.
QA Systems Cantata	Proprietary	No	Yes	Yes	Yes	Yes	Yes	Yes	Yes	Yes		Commercial. Automated unit and integration testing tool for C++. Certified testing for host or embedded systems. Code coverage and unique call interface control to simulate and intercept calls.
Casmine	GPL 2.0	No	Yes	Yes	No	No	Yes	Yes	Yes	Yes		C++17, modeled after the Jasmine testing framework, type-safe tests, auto-registration, BDD features, focused/disabled/pending tests, flexible configuration (JSON), colored console reporter, extendable, Windows/Linux/macOS
Catch or Catch2	Boost	No	Yes	Yes	Yes	No	Yes	Yes	Yes	Yes		Header only, no external dependencies, auto-registration, tdd and bdd features
CATCH-VC6		No	Yes	Yes	Yes	No	Yes	Yes	Yes	Yes		VC6 port of CATCH
cfix		Yes	Yes	No	No	No	Yes	Yes	No			Specialized for Windows development—both Win32 and NT kernel mode. Compatible to WinUnit.
Cput		Yes	Yes	Yes	Yes		Yes	Yes	No	Suites		Library and MS Visual Studio add-in to create and run unit tests. Open Source.
CPPOCL/test	Apache 2	No	Yes		No		Yes	Yes				Released Under Apache 2.0, compliant with C++ 98 and C++ 11. Works for Linux, Windows 32/64 bit using gcc, Cygwin, VS2005, VS2015. Header file only library. Provides ability to write performance tests in a similar way to unit tests. Has some support for reporting memory leaks.
CppTest	GNU LGPL		Yes					Yes		Suites		Released under LGPL
cpptest-lite	MIT		Yes				Yes	Yes		Suites		Released under MIT. Developed for C++11.
CppUnit	GNU LGPL	Yes	Yes	Yes	No	No	Yes	Yes	No	Suites		Released under LGPL
Name	License	xUnit	Fixtures	Group fixtures	Generators	Mocks	Exceptions	Macros	Templates	Grouping	Source	Remarks
CppUTest		Yes	Yes	Yes	No	Yes	No	Yes	No	Suites		Limited C++ set by design to keep usage easy and allow it to work on embedded platforms. C++ is buried in macros so the learning curve for C programmers is minimal. Ported to Symbian. Has a mocking support library CppUMock
CppUnitLite		Yes			No	No	No	Yes	No	Suites		
CPUnit		Yes	Yes	Yes	No	No	Yes	Yes	Yes	Yes		Released under BSD.
Criterion	MIT	Yes	Yes	Yes	Yes	No	Yes	Yes	Yes	Suites		Unit testing framework with automatic test registration. Needs C++11 compiler support for the C++ API. Supports theories and parameterized tests. Each test is run in its own process, so signals and crashes can be reported. Can output to multiple formats, like the TAP format or JUnit XML. Supports Linux, macOS, FreeBSD, Windows.
libcester	MIT	Yes	Yes	Yes	Yes	Yes	Yes	Yes	No	File		A robust header only unit testing framework for C and C++ programming language. Support function mocking, memory leak detection, crash report. Works on various platforms including embedded systems and compatible with various compilers. Outputs to multiple format like TAP, JunitXML, TAPV13 or plain text.
crpcut		No	Yes		No	No		Yes	Yes	Suites within Suites		BSD 2 clause. Runs each test in its own process, guaranteeing that the test suite continues even in the event of an unexpected crash or infinite loop.
CUTE		Yes	Yes	No	No	Yes	Yes			Suites		CUTE (C++ Unit Testing Easier) with Eclipse CDT integration. Single line include, without inheritance. Mock support is provided by Mockator.
cutee		No	No	No	No							
CuteX		No	No	No	No	No	Yes	No	Yes	Yes (by wildcard)		Native C++ unit test framework using template recursive, no "weird" fixture. Assertion template only, zero learning time. Header only, no external library.
CxxTest		Yes	Yes	Yes	No	Yes*	Optional	Yes	No	Suites		Uses a C++ parser and code generator (requiring Python) for test registration. * Has framework to generate mocks of global functions, but not of objects.
doctest	MIT	No	Yes	Yes	No	No	Yes	Yes	Yes	Yes		Light, feature rich C++ single header testing framework
Embunit		No				No	Yes					Commercial. Create unit tests for C/C++ and Embedded C++
Exercisix	BSD	No	No	No	No	No	Yes	Yes	Yes	Executables		Goal: make adding tests as fast and easy as possible.
FakeIt	MIT					Yes						Use the latest C++11 features to create an expressive, yet very simple, API.
FCTX		Yes	Yes	Yes	No	No	No	Yes	No	Yes		Fast and complete unit testing framework all in one header. Declare and write your functions in one step. No dependencies. Cross platform.
Fructose		No	Yes	No	Yes	No	Yes	Yes	Yes	No		A simple unit test framework.
Name	License	xUnit	Fixtures	Group fixtures	Generators	Mocks	Exceptions	Macros	Templates	Grouping	Source	Remarks
Google C++ Mocking Framework						Yes	No	Yes	Yes			
Google Test	BSD	Yes	Yes			Yes	Yes	Yes	Yes			Supports automatic test discovery, a rich set of assertions, user-defined assertions, death tests, fatal and non-fatal failures, various options for running the tests, and XML test report generation.
Hestia	MIT	Yes	Yes	Yes	No	No	Yes	Yes	Yes	Suites		Open source. Can test servers, libraries, and applications, and embedded software. Outputs to stdout, text, html, or xml files. Has several assertions for messaging, warnings, and exceptions, as well as plain conditions.
Hippomocks						Yes	No	Yes	Yes			
Igloo			Yes (Contexts)	No	No	No	Yes	Yes	Yes	Yes (nested contexts)		BDD style unit testing in C++
lest		No	Yes	No	No	No	Yes	Yes	Yes	No		Tiny header-only C++11 test framework
liblittletest		Yes	Yes	Yes	No	No	Yes	Yes	Yes	Yes		Portable, one file header-only C++ library for unit testing. Supports a rich set of assertions, automatic test discovering, various options for running the tests.
libunittest		Yes	Yes	Yes	No	No	Yes	Yes	Yes	Yes		Portable C++ library for unit testing, uses C++11.
mettle	BSD											
Microsoft Unit Testing Framework for C++	Proprietary	Yes	Yes	Yes	No	No	Yes	Yes	Yes	Yes		Commercial. Integrated into Microsoft Visual Studio 2012 IDE and later versions.
Mimicc	Proprietary					Yes						Fully automated mock generation for C and C++. Based on clang, provides the ability to compile header files straight into linkable mock object files and control them with an accompanying API.
Mockator						Yes	No	Yes	Yes			Header-only mock object library and an Eclipse plug-in to create test doubles in a simple yet powerful way; leverages new C++11 language facilities while still being compatible with C++03; has built-in support for CUTE
mock++/mockcpp		Yes	Yes		No	Yes	Yes	Yes	Yes	Suites		Simple testing framework for C++ (requires cmake)
mockitopp						Yes						A C++ mock object framework providing similar syntax to mockito for Java.
mockpp		Yes	Yes		Yes	Yes	Yes	Yes	Yes	Suites		A C++ mocking framework hosted by Google
Name	License	xUnit	Fixtures	Group fixtures	Generators	Mocks	Exceptions	Macros	Templates	Grouping	Source	Remarks
NanoCppUnit		No	Yes	Yes	No	No	No	Yes	Yes	Suites		Proof-of-concept
NullUnit		Yes	Yes	Yes	No	No	Yes	Yes	Yes	Suites		Low effort, easy to use. Supports automatic test discovery, user-defined assertions, fatal and non-fatal conditions, XML test report generation, and strong support for IDE integration.
OAKUT		No	No	Yes	Yes (XML)	No	Yes	Yes	Yes	XML		Uses shared libraries / DLLs
Opmock	GNU GPL	Yes	Yes	Yes	Yes	Yes	No	Yes	No	Yes		Stubbing and mocking framework for C and C++ based on code generation from headers. Does not imply modification to your existing code, so well suited for legacy code refactoring. In particular, you don't need virtual operations or abstract classes. Can check call parameters, call sequence, handle multiple implementations of a mock, and more. Includes as well a small unit testing framework, with Junit compatible xml output, but works also with any unit testing framework.
Parasoft C/C++test	Proprietary	Yes	Yes	Yes	Yes	Yes with proper configuration	Yes	Yes	Yes	Yes		Commercial. Automated unit/component test generation and execution on host or embedded systems with code coverage and runtime error detection. Also provides static analysis and peer code review.
snitch	Boost	No	Yes	Yes	No	No	Yes	Yes	Yes	Yes		Lightweight C++20 testing framework without heap allocations
QtTest	GNU LGPL	Yes	Yes	No	No	No	Yes	No	No			Built on the ultra cross platform Qt Library. Allows testing on Windows, macOS, Linux, BSD, Symbian, and any other platform Qt can build on.
QuickCheck++												Framework for automatically generating tests. Inspired by QuickCheck
QuickTest		No	No	No	No	No	Yes	Yes	Yes	No		
Rexo	Public domain	Yes	Yes	Yes	No	No	No	Yes	No	Yes		Framework for C89/C++ featuring automatic registration of tests and a polished API.
SafetyNet		Yes	Yes	No	Yes	Yes	Yes	Yes	No	No		Lightweight fast unit testing framework that is easy to set up and use. Works on Windows and Linux. Supports GNU C++, VC++, MinGW, QtSDK and can create test projects for VisualStudio, CodeBlocks, Eclipse, KDevelop
ShortCUT		No								Yes		
STRIDE	Proprietary	Yes	Yes	Yes	No	Yes	Yes	Yes	Yes	Yes		Commercial. Embedded software quality solution that includes techniques for unit, API, Behavior & Integration testing as well as interactive reporting portal
Name	License	xUnit	Fixtures	Group fixtures	Generators	Mocks	Exceptions	Macros	Templates	Grouping	Source	Remarks
Symbian OS Unit		Yes										Based on CxxTest
TBrun	Proprietary											Commercial. Generators available across another component named TBExtreme
Tau	MIT	Yes	Yes			No	Yes	Yes	Yes			A Micro Unit testing framework for C/C++ (~1k lines of code). Includes a rich set of assertion macros, supports automatic test registration and can output to multiple formats, like the TAP format or JUnit XML. Supports Linux, macOS, FreeBSD, Windows.
TESSY	Proprietary											Commercial.
TDOG		Yes	Yes	Yes	Yes	No	Yes	Yes	Yes	Macro (namespaces)		TDOG is a lightweight, portable and open source C++ xUnit Testing Framework.
Test soon		No	Yes	Yes	Yes	No	Auto-detect	Yes	Yes	Macro (namespaces)		Complex macro logic (deliberately)
Testwell CTA++	Proprietary	Yes	No	No	Yes	No	Yes	Yes	Yes			Commercial.
tpunit++		Yes	Yes		No	No	Optional	Yes	Yes			A simple, portable C++ xUnit library contained in a single header.
TPT	Proprietary	Yes	Yes	Yes	Yes	No	No	Depends	Depends	Yes		Time Partition Testing: Automated model based unit and integration testing for embedded systems. For C code under test, TPT supports automatic test frame generation including automatic interface analysis as well as automatic test execution, evaluation and logging.
Trompeloeil	Boost					Yes						Simple, yet powerful, single header framework for mocking. Requires C++14.
TUT		No	No	Yes	No	No	Yes	Yes	Yes	Templates		Based on templates. Automatic test registration/discovery, customizable reports generation process, various tests run options. Easy adaptable to work on Windows CE.
Typemock Isolator++		Yes	Yes			Yes	Yes	Yes	Yes			Commercial. Isolation/Mocking Framework for C/C++
Unit++												
unit.hpp		No	Yes	No	Yes	No	Yes	Yes	No			Extremely lightweight single header (<500loc) unit testing framework. It follows the spirit of D in regards to unit tests. Automatic test discovery. RAII style test setup that are reusable in SECTIONs (Similar to Catch).
UnitTest++		No	Yes	Yes		No	Yes	Yes	Yes	Suites		UnitTest++ is free software. Simplicity, portability, speed, and small footprint are all important aspects of UnitTest++.
upp11		Yes	Yes	No	No	No	Yes	Yes	Yes	Yes		Free software. Minimal (single small header), auto test registrations, parametrized tests, etc. C++11 only.
UquoniTest	Proprietary	Yes	Yes	Yes	No	Yes	Yes	Yes	Yes	Yes		Commercial. Adds features like easy creation of (reusable) test directories, Rich Booleans in assertions, and more.
μt	Boost	No	Yes	Yes	No	No	Yes	No	Yes	Yes		C++20 single header/single module, macro-free μ(micro)/Unit Testing Framework with no dependencies.
VectorCAST/C++	Proprietary	No	Yes	Yes	Yes	Yes	Yes	Yes	Yes	Yes		Commercial. Automated unit and integration testing, and code coverage.
Visual Assert		Yes	Yes	No	No	No	Yes	Yes	No			Unit-Testing Add-In for Visual Studio. Based on the cfix testing framework.
WinUnit												Focused more toward C/C++ than .NET developers
Name	License	xUnit	Fixtures	Group fixtures	Generators	Mocks	Exceptions	Macros	Templates	Grouping	Source	Remarks
xTests							Yes	Yes				Depends on STLSoft C & C++ Libraries
xUnit++		Yes	Yes	Yes	Yes		Yes	Yes, Test setup only	Yes	Yes, Suites and Attributes		Supports running tests concurrently. Macros are used for test setup only, not for test assertions.
tinytest	Apache 2	Yes						Yes				Standalone, no dependencies, header-only.
sTest	MIT						Yes	Yes	Yes	Yes		Lightweight (one header file, uses standard library). Simple to use and write tests quickly (no need to: build special constructions, create objects, use scope, catch or throw exceptions). Counting, grouping and merging tests. Easy to modify output (separated logic from printing logs). Needs C++11.
Name	License	xUnit	Fixtures	Group fixtures	Generators	Mocks	Exceptions	Macros	Templates	Grouping	Source	Remarks

=== C for Graphics (Cg) ===
Name	xUnit	Source	Remarks
UnitTestCg	No		Pixel and Vertex Shaders supported.

=== COBOL ===
Name	xUnit	Source	Remarks
COBOLUnit	Yes		A simple, open source Unit testing framework to write and run repeatable tests in COBOL. Distributed under GNU General Public License.
cobol-unit-test	No		Enable isolated unit testing of individual paragraphs in COBOL programs, in a standalone environment with no connection to a z/OS system. Distributed under GNU General Public License.
ECBLUnit	No		Simple Unit Testing for z/OS written in IBM Enterprise COBOL. Distributed under GNU General Public License.
GCBLUnit	No		Simple Unit Testing for GnuCOBOL written in GnuCOBOL. Distributed under GNU General Public License.
savvytest	No		Commercial tool (rather than a framework) to edit and perform component tests on the IBM mainframe platform
Topaz for Total Test	No		Commercial tool (rather than a framework) to automatically create and execute mainframe unit tests; provide data stubbing; provide default test assertions that can be changed and more.
zUnit	Yes		Commercial framework on the IBM mainframe platform
mfunit (MFU)	Yes		Commercial framework for testing Micro Focus COBOL programs on the Windows/Unix platforms
CC Analyzer	No		Commercial Code Coverage Analysis tool. Supports IBM mainframe, Windows, Unix platforms

=== ColdFusion (CFML) ===
Name	xUnit	Source	Remarks
CFUnit			No longer maintained.
cfcUnit	Yes		
MXUnit	Yes		Unit Test Framework with Eclipse and Sublime Text Plugins for CFML on ColdFusion, Railo, and Lucee
TestBox	Yes		xUnit and Behavior Driven Testing Framework for CFML ColdFusion, Railo, and Lucee
MockBox	No		Mocking/Stubbing Framework for CFML (ColdFusion)

=== Crystal ===
Name	xUnit	Source	Remarks
Crotest			MIT License. A tiny and simple test framework for Crystal with common assertions and no pollution into Object class.

=== Curl ===
Name	xUnit	Source	Remarks
CurlUnit			

=== Dart ===
Name	xUnit	Source	Remarks
test			
dartunit	Yes		

=== DataFlex ===
Name	xUnit	Source	Remarks
DFUnit	Yes		

=== Delphi ===
Name	License	Source	Remarks
DUnit	"AS IS"		Support FastMM4
DUnitX	Apache 2.0		Support FastMM4, FastMM5, Delphi-Mocks

=== ECMAScript ===
==== ActionScript, Apache Flex ====
Name	xUnit	Source	Remarks
FlexUni			
Breeze Test			Simple Unit Testing for AIR
FlexUnit 4	Yes		Metadata-driven unit testing for Flex 2,3 and 4 and ActionScript 3 projects
Reflex Unit			Metadata-driven unit testing framework for Flex 2 and 3
ASTUce	Yes		Unit testing for ActionScript 3 (also JavaScript, ActionScript 1 & 2), that can also run on the command-line with a cross-platform executable (supports macOS, Linux, Windows)
AsUnit			Flash Players 6, 7, 8, 9 and 10
dpUInt			Unit and Integration testing framework for Flex 2 and 3
Fluint			Unit and Integration testing framework for Flex 2 and 3
morefluent			More fluent testing of asynchronous behaviors in Flex
mojotest	Yes		(under development) Unit testing for ActionScript 3, Flash Player 10

==== Haxe ====
Name	xUnit	Source	Remarks
munit			Produces HTML reports for multiple compile targets including JavaScript, ActionScript and C++
hexUnit			

==== JavaScript ====
Name	xUnit	TAP	Client-side	Server-side	Source	Remarks
AVA	Yes	Yes	No	Yes		Futuristic JavaScript test runner
Suitest			Yes	Yes		[OBSOLETE]: Suitest is a powerful and easy-to-use JavaScript BDD test suite
DOH			Yes	Yes		Dojo Objective Harness that can be run in-browser or independently via Rhino
LBRTW UT		No	Yes	No		Developed as a learning project
JSUnit	Yes	No	Yes	No		JSUnit is no longer actively maintained
Enhance JS	Yes	No	Yes	No		Port of Enhance PHP
QUnit		Yes	Yes	Yes		jQuery test harness
Unit.js	Compatible	Yes	Yes	Yes		Unit testing framework for javascript and Node.js. Unit.js works with any unit testing framework and assertion libraries. Multiple assertions styles: TDD, BDD, spec (provides a spec documentation generator), expect, ...
RhUnit			Yes	Yes		QUnit compatible Rhino/JUnit framework
Crosscheck			No	Yes		Browserless Java-based framework
J3Unit			Yes	No		
Mocha	Yes	Yes	Yes	Yes		JavaScript test framework running on node.js
intern	No	Yes	Yes	Yes		
JSNUnit			Yes	No		
YUI Test	Yes	Yes	Yes	Yes		
JSSpec			Yes	No		Behaviour-driven development framework
UnitTesting			Yes	No		script.aculo.us javascript test harness
JSpec			Yes	Yes		Highly readable BDD, 50+ matchers, DOM / framework independent, async, rhino, node.js support and more (no longer maintained)
Jasmine			Yes	Yes		BDD, framework independent, easy integration with Ruby projects and continuous builds. Allows for both DOM-less testing and asynchronous testing.
screw-unit			Yes	No		Requires jQuery
Tape	Yes	Yes	Yes	Yes		TAP-producing test harness for node and browsers
teenytest	Yes	Yes	No	Yes		Zero-API minimal test runner
Test.Simple	No	Yes	Yes	No		Write TAP-emitting unit tests in JavaScript and run them in your browser.
Test.More	No[1]	Yes	Yes	No		Write TAP-emitting unit tests in JavaScript and run them in your web browser.
TestCase			Yes	No		
TestIt			Yes	Yes		Light-weight, non-polluting, and easy to set up and use
testdouble.js	Compatible		Yes	Yes		Opinionated test double (e.g. mock/spy/stub) library, compatible with any test framework
jsUnitTest			Yes	Yes		Based on TestCase but without the Prototype dependency
JSTest			Yes	No		Light-weight, non-polluting browser-based framework
JSTest.NET			No	Yes		Browserless JavaScript unit test runner for use with MsTest, XUnit, NUnit, etc.
jsUnity	Yes	No	Yes	Yes		Context-agnostic (JavaScript, JScript (ASP/WSH), Rhino, etc.)
RhinoUnit			No	Yes		Rhino-based framework that allows tests to be run in Ant
JasUnit	Yes	No	Yes	No		Light-weight framework. Part of a project that provides Mocks and IoC.
FireUnit			Yes	No		Testing framework that provides logging and viewing within a new tab of Firebug.
Js-test-driver	Yes		Yes	No		The goal of JsTestDriver is to build a JavaScript test runner which easily integrates with continuous builds systems and allows running tests on multiple browsers quickly to ease TDD style development.
Js-test-runner	No		Yes	Yes		A JUnit test runner that runs JavaScript tests. The goal of the JS Test Runner is to be able to test JavaScript code using an approach that test driven programmers will feel comfortable with; particularly in the context of Continuous Integration.
Sinon.js	Compatible		Yes	Yes		Standalone test spies, stubs and mocks for JavaScript. No dependencies, works with any unit testing framework.
SOAtest	No		Yes	No		Commercial. Testing platform whose record/playback runs in most modern web browsers where client-side Javascript can be tested both through static analysis and functional verification.
Vows	No			Yes		
Nodeunit			Yes	Yes		Asynchronous Javascript testing framework
Tyrtle			Yes	Yes		Testing framework which allows expressive assertions and interactive test output
wru	Compatible		Yes	Yes		General purpose environment agnostic sync/async JavaScript test framework. Compatible with any browser, desktop or mobile, node.js, Rhino, and phantom.js. Tiny, essential, fast.
Buster.JS	Compatible	Yes	Yes	Yes		BDD/xUnit, assertions, expectations, browser/server, extendable with tools like linting and other QA measures, highly configurable, well documented and actively developed
Lighttest			Yes	Yes		Minimalistic testing library, supports flow control, focused on keeping the tests clear
Chai			Yes	Yes		BDD / TDD assertion library for node and the browser that can be delightfully paired with any javascript testing framework.
JSUS			Yes	No		A simple JavaScript Unit teSting tool
Wallaby.js			Yes	Yes		Commercial. Continuous test runner that reports code coverage and other results directly to the code editor immediately as the code changes. Supports AVA, Jasmine, Mocha, QUnit, Jest, Babel, Webpack, Browserify, CoffeeScript, TypeScript.
fast-check			Yes	Yes		Property Based Testing framework, similar to QuickCheck.
unexpected			Yes	Yes		The extensible BDD assertion toolkit.
Jest			Yes	Yes		A delightful JavaScript Testing Framework with a focus on simplicity.
CentiTF			Yes	Yes		Very small but powerful JavaScript unit test framework (129 lines of code, 2.3KB zipped).
RITEway	No	Yes	Yes	Yes		Simple, readable, helpful unit tests. See
Vitest	Yes	Yes	Yes	Yes		A Vite-native testing framework with Jest-compatible API.

=== Erlang ===
Name	xUnit	Fixtures	Group Fixtures	Generators	Source	Remarks
EUnit	Yes	Yes	Yes	Yes		Included in Erlang release R12B5 and later

=== F# ===
Name	xUnit	Source	Remarks
Foq	No		Lightweight type-safe and thread-safe mock object library for F# with C# and VB.Net support.
FsCheck	No		Random testing (Fuzzing) combinator library based on QuickCheck for Haskell.
FsMocks	No		F# mock library based on Rhino.Mocks.
FsTest	Yes		Domain specific language for writing language-oriented programming specifications in F#. Based on FsUnit syntax, but targeting xUnit.net.
FsUnit	No		Stand-alone Behavior Driven Development framework, with natural syntax for writing specifications.
NaturalSpec	No		Domain specific language for writing specifications in a natural language. Based on NUnit.
Unquote	Yes		Combines F# Quotation decompilation, evaluation, and incremental reduction implementations to allow test assertions to be written as plain, statically checked quoted expressions which produce step-by-step failure messages. Integrates configuration-free with all exception-based unit testing frameworks including xUnit.net, NUnit, and MbUnit. Unquote may also be used within FSI sessions.
Other		-	See also listing for .NET languages, elsewhere on this page.

=== Fortran ===
MPI column: Whether supports message passing via MPI - commonly used for high-performance scientific computing

Name	xUnit	Fixtures	Group fixtures	Generators	MPI	OpenMP	Source	Remarks
FUnit	Yes	Yes	Yes	No				Minimum Fortran plus assertions and boiler plate expanded via Ruby.
FRUIT	Yes	Yes	Yes	Yes				Written in Fortran 95 yet works with code written in any version of Fortran. Has assertions, fixture, setup, teardown, reporting and more. Generator in Ruby.
Ftnunit								
pFUnit	Yes	Yes	Yes	Yes	Yes	Yes		Supports testing of MPI and OpenMP based procedures. A fully object-oriented implementation using Fortran 2003 is now available. In use with a range of legacy and new Fortran code.
ObjexxFTK:UnitTest								User writes Fortran tests: Python script automatically finds all tests and generates the Fortran test driver. Supports F77-F2003. Assertion support and string and array libs included.
XFunit	Yes	Yes	Yes	Yes				Object-oriented (OO) framework, implements unit tests in native Fortran, uses OO features of Fortran 2018.
Zofu					Yes			

=== Go ===
Name	xUnit	Source	Remarks
go test			'Go test' automates testing the packages named by the import paths.
go2xunit	Yes		Converts go test -v (or gocheck -vv) output to xunit or xunit.net compatible XML output (used in Jenkins/Hudson).

=== Groovy ===
All entries under Java may also be used in Groovy.

Name	xUnit	Source	Remarks
easyb			BDD
Spock	Yes		BDD with built-in Mocking and Spy capabilities.
Gmock	Yes		Mocking Framework

=== Haskell ===
Name	xUnit	Source	Remarks
HUnit	Yes		
HUnit-Plus	Yes		
QuickCheck	No		QuickCheck
SmallCheck	No		Exhaustive analysis test of "small" example data.
Hspec			RSpec-style BDD framework for Haskell that integrates with QuickCheck and HUnit.
chuchu	No		Cucumber-style acceptance testing framework for Haskell
bdd	No		Internal domain-specific language for testing programs using Behavior-Driven Development process
test-framework	Yes		Framework for running and organising tests, with HUnit and QuickCheck support
HTF	Yes		Top-level module that re-exports functionality from sub-modules. Modules that only define unit tests and quickcheck properties typically only need to import this module. Your test driver should additionally import TestManager and, if needed, BlackBoxTest.

=== High-Level Shader Language (HLSL) ===
Name	xUnit	Source	Remarks
UnitTestCg	No		Pixel and Vertex Shaders supported.

=== Identity management ===
Name	xUnit	Source	Remarks
IdMUnit	Yes		Unit testing framework designed for identity provisioning and access management workflows.

=== IGOR Pro ===
Name	TAP	xUnit	Fixtures	Group fixtures	Source	Remarks
UTF	Yes	Yes	Yes	Yes		Compatible with versions 6/7/8

=== Interactive Data Language (IDL) ===
Name	xUnit	Source	Remarks
MGunit	Yes		
white paper			Only a white paper, not a framework

=== HTTP request ===
Name	xUnit	Source	Remarks
HtmlUnit			Java headless browser emulator
HttpUnit			Testing framework for web applications, typically used in combination with JUnit
IEUnit			Testing framework for web applications, based on IE browser and JavaScript
Canoo WebTest			Open source framework based on HtmlUnit. Support both XML-like or Groovy syntax in scripting.
Selenium			Testing framework whose playback can run in most modern web browsers to test webpages.
Watir			Testing framework based on the Ruby language, that can run in web browsers to test webpages.
SoapUI			Open source web service testing platform for service-oriented architectures.
SOAtest			Commercial. API testing platform whose record/playback runs in most modern web browsers to test webpages. Supports Selenium WebDriver.
Traffic Parrot			An API simulation and Service virtualization platform supporting several protocols and APIs. Allows for testing components in isolation.

=== Java ===
Name	xUnit	Source	Remarks
Agitar	Yes		Automates creation of thorough JUnit tests in code
Artos	Yes		Open source framework for writing Unit, Integration and functional tests. It includes pre-configured logging framework and extent reports, utilities to write flow for manual/semi-automated testing. It supports BDD testing using cucumber scripts.
Arquillian	Yes		Open source framework for writing Integration and functional tests. It includes Arquillian graphene, Drone and Selenium to write tests to the visual layer too.
AssertJ			Fluent assertions for java
beanSpec			Behavior-driven development
BeanTest	No		A tiny Java web test framework built to use WebDriver/HTMLUnit within BeanShell scripts
Cactus			A JUnit extension for testing Java EE and web applications. Cactus tests are executed inside the Java EE/web container.
Concordion			Acceptance test-driven development, Behavior-driven development, Specification by example
Concutest			A framework for testing concurrent programs
Cucumber-JVM			Behavior-driven development replaces deprecated JRuby-based Cuke4Duke
Cuppa			Behavior-driven development framework for Java 8
DbUnit			A JUnit extension to perform unit testing with database-driven programs
EasyMock			A mock framework
EtlUnit	Yes		A unit testing framework for Extract-Transform-Load processes, written in Java. Capable of testing Oracle, Informatica, SqlServer, PostGreSQL, MySQL, etc.
EvoSuite			A test case generation tool that can automatically generate JUnit tests.
GrandTestAuto			GrandTestAuto (GTA) is a platform for the complete automated testing of Java software. Tests can be distributed across a number of machines on a network.
GroboUtils			A JUnit extension providing automated documentation, class hierarchy unit testing, code coverage, and multi-threaded tests.
Hamcrest			Creating customized assertion matchers that can be used together with unit testing frameworks
HavaRunner	Yes		A JUnit runner with built-in concurrency support, suites and scenarios.
Instinct			Behavior-driven development
Java Server-Side Testing framework (JSST)			Java Server-Side Testing framework which is based on the similar idea to the one of Apache CACTUS, but unlike CACTUS it's not coupled to JUnit 3.x and can be used with any testing framework.
JBehave			Behavior-driven development
JDave			Behavior-driven development
JExample	Yes		A JUnit extension that uses dependencies between test cases to reduce code duplication and improves defect localization.
JGiven			Behavior-driven development
JMock			A mock framework
JMockit			Open source framework. Tests can easily be written that will mock final classes, static methods, constructors, and so on. There are no limitations.
Jnario	Yes		Behavior-driven development like Cucumber
jqwik			JUnit 5 test engine for Property-based Testing
Jtest	Yes		Commercial. Automated unit/component test generation and execution with code coverage and runtime error detection. Also provides static analysis and peer code review.
Jukito			Combines Mockito and Google Guice to allow automatic mocking and instantiation of dependencies
JUnit	Yes		
JUnitEE			A JUnit extension for testing Java EE applications
JWalk			Fast, semi-automatic creation of exhaustive unit test-sets
Mockito			A mock framework enabling more black-box testing
Mockrunner			A JUnit extension for testing testing servlets, filters, tag classes and Struts actions and forms.
Needle			Open source framework for testing Java EE components outside of the container in isolation.
NUTester			Testing framework developed at Northeastern University to aid in teaching introductory computer science courses in Java
OpenPojo			Open source framework used to validate and enforce POJO behavior as well as manage identity - equals, hashCode & toString.
Pitest			Mutation testing framework for evaluating the quality of unit tests
PowerMock			An extension to both Mockito and EasyMock that allows mocking of static methods, constructors, final classes and methods, private methods, removal of static initializers and more.
Randoop	Yes		Automatically finds bugs and generates unit tests for Java, via feedback-directed random testing (a variant of Fuzzing).
Spock			Spock is a testing and specification framework for Java and Groovy applications. Spock supports specification by example and BDD style testing.
SpryTest	Yes		Commercial. Automated Unit Testing Framework for Java
SureAssert			An integrated Java unit testing solution for Eclipse. Contract-First Design and test-driven development
Tacinga			Uses a pure object-oriented programming approach and offers a commercial license and free support.
TestNG	Yes		Tests can include unit tests, functional tests, and integration tests. Has facilities to create even non-functional tests (as loading tests, timed tests).
Testcontainers			Testcontainers is an open source library for providing throwaway, lightweight instances of databases, message brokers, web browsers, or just about anything that can run in a container.
Unitils			Offers general utilities and features for helping with persistence layer testing and testing with mock objects. Offers specific support for testing application code that makes use of JPA, hibernate and spring. Unitils integrates with the test frameworks JUnit and TestNG.
XMLUnit			JUnit and NUnit testing for XML

=== LabVIEW ===
Name	xUnit	Source	Remarks
LabVIEW Unit Test Framework	No		Generate test harnesses for VIs in LabVIEW automatically.
VI Tester	Yes		native LabVIEW object-oriented implementation of xUnit framework. Unit tests are written as VIs in LabVIEW.
Caraya	Yes		native LabVIEW implementation of xUnit framework.
InstaCoverage	Yes		LabVIEW unit testing framework with fast code coverage measurement.

=== Lasso ===
Name	xUnit	Source	Remarks
L-Unit			

=== LaTeX ===
Name	xUnit	Source	Remarks
qstest			

=== Lisp ===
==== AutoLISP, Visual Lisp ====
Name	xUnit	Source	Remarks
vl-unit			Unit testing framework for Visual Lisp.

==== Clojure ====
Name	xUnit	Source	Remarks
clojure.test (built-in)	Yes		
Expectations	Yes		
Midje			
Speclj	Yes		
test.check			

==== Common Lisp ====
Name	xUnit	Source	Remarks
CLUnit			
CyberTiggyr Test			
FiveAM	No		
FReT			
grand-prix			
HEUTE			
LIFT			
lisp-unit			
prove			
RT			
stefil			
XLUnit			

==== Emacs Lisp ====
Name	xUnit	Source	Remarks
Buttercup			
ElUnit			
elk-test	No		
Unit-test.el			

==== Racket ====
Name	xUnit	Source	Remarks
rackunit	Yes		Open source
Overeasy	No		Open source

==== Scheme ====
Name	xUnit	Source	Remarks
SchemeUnit	Yes		
Testeez	No		
SRFI-64	No		

=== Lua ===
Name	xUnit	TAP	Source	Remarks
lua-TestMore	No	Yes		Port of Perl Test::More
LuaUnit	Yes	Yes		
lunit	No	No		

=== MATLAB ===
Name	xUnit	Source	Remarks
mlUnit	Yes		
mlUnit 2008a	Yes		
Legland's MUnit			Inspired Lombardi's MUnit
Lombardi's MUnit			Similar to xUnit
MATLAB xUnit Test Framework	Yes		MATLAB R2008a and later (uses OOP features introduced in this release). Renamed from mtest. Accepts both xUnit-style subclass or simple MATLAB function test cases.
Doctest	No	Bitbucket repository - source and documentation	Allows automated test cases to be put in the documentation, so use examples double as test cases and vice versa. A TAP producer. Inspired by the Python module of the same name. As of August 2011, it can only handle one line test-cases and its exception handling facility cannot handle exceptions generated after other output.
matlab.unittest	Yes	MATLAB documentation	Included as part of MATLAB R2013a
MOxUnit	Yes	GitHub repository	Works for both MATLAB and GNU Octave. Uses old-style OOP features and is compatible with the MATLAB xUnit Test Framework. Can be used with the Travis-ci and Shippable continuous integration services (example), and integrates with MOcov to provide code coverage reports either offline or through coveralls.io(example).
TTEST	No	Gitlab repository	Works for both MATLAB and GNU Octave. Consists of an assertion framework and tools for refactoring. Framework is targeted at scientific code and scientific people.

=== .NET ===
Name	xUnit	Source	Remarks
Atata	Yes		Test automation full featured framework based on Selenium WebDriver.
csUnit	Yes		includes GUI, command line, VS2005 plug-in; supports C#, VB.NET, Managed C++, J#, other .NET languages, supports .NET 3.5 and earlier versions; integrated with ReSharper
DbUnit.NET			A .NET 2.0 unit testing framework for database access code
ErrorUnit			Generates Unit Tests from logged error's, or paused Visual Studio's call stack; Mocks parameters, class values, EF Data accessed so far.
Fixie	Yes		Based on NUnit and xUnit, with an emphasis on customization through user-defined conventions. Integrates with TestDriven.NET.
FluentAssertions	Yes		
Foq	No		Lightweight type-safe and thread-safe mock object library for F# with C# support.
Gallio			Extensible, and neutral automation platform that provides a common object model, runtime services and tools (such as test runners) that may be leveraged by many test frameworks.
LightBDD	Yes		Lightweight Behavior Driven Development test framework
MbUnit	Yes		Extensible, model-based nUnit compatible framework. Part of the Gallio Test Automation Platform.
Moq	Yes		Moq is a .NET Framework library for creating mock objects. It leverages C# 3.0 lambda expressions, typically used in Test Driven Development.
MSTest	No		A command-line tool for executing Visual Studio created unit tests outside of the Visual Studio IDE - not really a testing framework as it is a part of the Visual Studio Unit Testing Framework.
NaturalSpec	No		Domain-specific language for writing specifications in a natural language. Based on NUnit.
NBi	Yes		Data centric test framework specialized for the Microsoft Business Intelligence platform. Tests equivalence of result sets based on SQL, MDX or DAX queries, performance, syntax, structure and dimensions' members (Multidimensional and Tabular SSAS). Includes a tests generator.
NFluent			Fluent assertion library, to be used on top of any testing framework. Make tests easier to read and generate rich error messages on test failure.
NMate			NUnit and PartCover Code Generation and integration Addin for Microsoft Visual Studio 2005/2008
Nuclear.Test	No		Command line based unit test platform that can handle .NETStandard and other flavors of .NET, integrates into Visual Studio as external Tool.
NUnit	Yes		includes GUI, command line, integrates into Visual Studio with ReSharper
NUnitAsp			Based on NUnit
Pex	Yes		Microsoft Research project providing White box testing for .NET, using the Z3 constraint solver to generate unit test input (rather than Fuzzing).
Quality Gate One Studio	No		Commercial/freeware test framework for unit and integration testing that analyses dependencies between test cases to flow data between them. Supports combinatorial testing, multithreading and time-dependencies.
QuickUnit.net	No		Implement unit tests without coding. Minimalist approach to test driven development.
Randoop.NET	Yes		Automatically finds bugs and generates unit tests for .NET, via feedback-directed random testing (a variant of Fuzzing).
Rhino Mocks	Yes		A dynamic mock object framework for the .NET framework.
Roaster	Yes		NUnit-based framework and tools for the .NET Compact Framework
SpecFlow	Yes		Behavior Driven Development framework for .NET. Inspired by Cucumber. Integrates with NUnit, MSTest, MbUnit, and others.
Specter	Yes		Behavior-driven development with an easy and readable syntax for writing specifications. Includes command line, optional integration with NUnit
TestDriven.NET			Commercial
.TEST	Yes		Commercial. Automated software quality solution that includes unit test generation and execution as well as reporting industry standard code coverage.
TickSpec	Yes		Behavior-driven development framework for .NET and Silverlight. Supports the Gherkin language as used by Cucumber and extends it with combinatorial examples. Integrates with NUnit, xUnit, MbUnit and MSTest.
TPT	Yes		Time Partition Testing (TPT) is a tool for model-based testing of embedded systems that provides a .NET-API for the TPT-VM for testing controller software.
Typemock Isolator	Yes		Commercial unit testing framework with simple API and test code generation features, supports C#, ASP.NET, SharePoint, Silverlight.
Visual Studio	No		The Visual Studio Unit Testing Framework was first included in Visual Studio Team System 2005 where it integrated with the IDE, but not available in the most-used Standard Edition. From Visual Studio 2008 it is available also in Professional Edition. Starting with Visual Studio Express 2013, it is included with Visual Studio Express editions.
Visual T#	Yes		Visual T# is a unit testing framework and development environment integrated with Visual Studio. It includes T#, a programming language designed specifically to naturally express unit test intentions, and tools for compiling, running and maintaining them.
xUnit.net	Yes		

=== Object Pascal, Free Pascal ===
Name	xUnit	TAP	Source	Remarks
FPCUnit	Yes	No		This is a port to Free Pascal of the JUnit core framework.
Tap4Pascal	No	Yes		A Pascal implementation of the Test Anything Protocol
FPTest	Yes	No		This is a fork of DUnit2, for use with the Free Pascal compiler.

==== Delphi ====
Name	xUnit	Source	License	Remarks
DUnit	Yes		MPL	-
DUnit2	Yes			-
DUnitX	Yes		Apache License	-
DUnitm	Yes			Single Unit, Classless framework.

=== Objective-C ===
Name	xUnit	Source	Remarks
GHUnit	Yes		An easy to integrate, use and visual test framework for simulator and devices.
CATCH	No		A modern, fully featured, unit test framework with no external dependencies - all implemented in headers
Cedar			BDD for Objective-C
Kiwi			RSpec-style BDD for Objective-C with support for mocks and stubs.
Specta			A light-weight TDD / BDD framework for Objective-C & Cocoa.
Quick			A behavior-driven development test framework for Swift and Objective-C.
ObjcUnit			
OCUnit	Yes		Comes with Xcode. Fully integrated with Xcode 4.
WiteBox for iPhone			For iPhone only unit testing, provides visual feedback, hierarchical results display, and test durations.
WOTest			
XCTest	Yes		Supports iOS, macOS. Requires Xcode 5. Derived from OCUnit.

=== OCaml ===
Name	xUnit	TAP	Source	Remarks
Alcotest				
OUnit				Based on HUnit, which is based on JUnit
Kaputt				
TestSimple		Yes		Generates TAP
FORT				

=== PegaRULES Process Commander ===
Name	xUnit	Source	Remarks
PRUnit	Yes		xUnit style testing adapted to PRPC

=== Perl ===
Name	xUnit	TAP	Source	Remarks
TAP	N/A	Yes		The Test Anything Protocol used by most Perl tests
Test::Harness	N/A	Yes		The standard Perl test runner and TAP parser
Test::More	No	Yes		The baseline testing module, included with all modern Perl installations
Test::Class	Yes	Yes		xUnit style testing adapted to Perl
Test::Class::Moose	Yes	Yes		xUnit testing for large-scale tests suites.
Test::Builder	N/A	Yes		A module for making more testing modules. These modules can be combined in a single test program
Test::Unit (a.k.a. PerlUnit)	Yes	No		a fairly straight port of JUnit to the Perl programming language. Note: This code seems to be abandoned as noted here and here.
Test::DBUnit	N/A	Yes		The database testing modules for both clear box and black box testing
Test::Unit::Lite	Yes	Yes (via Test::Unit::HarnessUnit)		Test::Unit replacement without external dependencies and with some bugs fixed
Test::Able	Yes	Yes		xUnit style testing with Moose

=== PHP ===
Name	xUnit	TAP	Source	Remarks
PHPUnit	Yes	Yes		Produces XML, HTML reports with code coverage
PHP Unit Testing Framework	Yes	No		It produces ASCII, XML or XHTML output and runs from the command line.
lime	No	Yes		Sub-project of Symfony
Lens	Yes	Yes		An invisible framework with readable tests that catch everything.
Atoum	Yes	Yes		A modern, simple and intuitive PHP 5.3+ unit testing framework.
SimpleTest	Yes	No		Unit test framework for both PHP and web
Testilence	Yes	No		last updated in 2009
Apache-Test	No	Yes		PHP implementation of Test::More (test-more.php)
SnapTest	Yes	Yes		SnapTest is a powerful unit testing framework for PHP 5+, leveraging PHP's unique runtime language to simplify the unit test process without sacrificing the agility tests provide.
OnionTest	No	Yes		Write an Onion! No coding needed just some txt files.
Enhance PHP	Yes	Yes		Unit testing framework with mocks and stubs built in. Runs in the command line or get HTML5, TAP or XML output via a web browser.
Tester	Yes	Yes		PHP library for unit-testing (in console and browser), simplified variant of PHPUnit. With ability to handle errors and exceptions in tests.
PhpInlineTest	No	No		PhpInlineTest - script to run inline tests for PHP functions and class methods.
PHPSpec	No	No		A BDD style testing framework.
Nette Tester	Yes	Yes		Sub-project of Nette Framework
Kahlan	Yes	No		Unit/BDD PHP Test Framework with Monkey Patching & Stubbing capabilities
Codeception	Yes	Yes		PHP testing framework, supports unit, functional and acceptance tests automation. written on top of PHPUnit. Codeception tests are written in a descriptive manner using a simple PHP DSL. Supports re-use, modules and addons. Also supports BDD style approach from the box.
Pest				Build on top of on PHPUnit with a focus on simplicity.

=== PowerBuilder ===
Name	xUnit	Source	Remarks
PBUnit			

=== PowerShell ===
Name	xUnit	Source	Remarks
Pester	No		a BDD and unit testing framework for PowerShell

=== OpenEdge Advanced Business Language (ABL), Progress 4GL ===
Name	xUnit	Source	Remarks
proUnit	Yes		xUnit-style framework for Progress OpenEdge procedures and objects
OEUnit	Yes		xUnit-style framework for Progress OpenEdge procedures and objects

=== Prolog ===
Name	xUnit	Source	Remarks
PlUnit			
Dogelog Tester			Provides dump of testresults for different systems, and fusion into single HTML reports

==== Logtalk ====
Name	xUnit	Source	Remarks
lgtunit	Yes		Supports code coverage at the predicate clause level, QuickCheck, plus TAP and xUnit output formats.

=== Puppet ===
Name	xUnit	Source	Remarks
Rspec-puppet			Rspec-puppet tests the behaviour of Puppet when it compiles a catalog

=== Python ===
Name	xUnit	Generators	Fixtures	Group Fixtures	Source	Remarks
Autotest	Yes		Yes			Used for Linux kernel testing.
Balder	Yes	Yes	Yes	Yes		Framework that enables maximum reuse of test code by separating abstract test scenarios (what needs to be tested) from concrete setups (specific devices/platforms under test implementation). It automatically matches and executes scenarios on compatible setups, allowing the same tests to run across similar but different products, embedded systems, or applications without rewriting code.
unittest	Yes	Yes	Yes	No		Sometimes referred to as PyUnit, has been included in Python standard library from Python version 2.1.
Doctest	No	No	No	No	No	Part of Python's standard library.
Nose	Yes	Yes	Yes			A discovery-based unittest extension.
Pytest	Yes	Yes	Yes	Yes		Distributed testing tool. Can output to multiple formats, like the TAP format, JUnit XML or SubUnit.
htf	Yes	Yes	Yes	Yes		Professional testing tool. Can output to multiple formats. Focus on reporting. Industry ready. Usable for hardware in the loop testing. Part of Hilster's QABench. Free community-license.
TwistedTrial	Yes	Yes	Yes	No		PyUnit extensions for asynchronous and event-driven code.
Should DSL	Yes	Yes	Yes	Yes		Distributed testing tool.
Green	Yes	Yes	Yes	No		Python test runner.

=== R ===
Name	xUnit	Source	Remarks
RUnit	No		Open source
testthat	Yes		Open source
tinytest	Yes		Open source

=== Rebol ===
Name	xUnit	Source	Remarks
Runit			

=== RPG ===
Name	xUnit	Source	Remarks
RPGUnit	Yes		

=== Ruby ===
Name	xUnit	Source	Remarks
Test::Unit	Yes		Default in Ruby 1.8, deprecated from 2.2. It was only a wrapper of minitest.
RSpec		Behaviour-driven development framework	
Shoulda			
microtest			
Bacon			
minitest	Yes		Ruby Gem by Ryan Davis. Default in Ruby >= 1.9, independent gem since 2.2. Recommended by official documentation.
TMF			

=== SAS (Statistical Analysis System) ===
Name	xUnit	Source	Remarks
FUTS	Yes		the Framework for Unit Testing SAS
SCLUnit	Yes		SAS/AF implementation of the xUnit unit testing framework SAS
SASUnit	Yes		written fully in SAS, runs with SAS on Windows and Linux

=== Scala ===
Name	xUnit	Source	Remarks
Rehersal			with JMock like Expectations and natural language test names.
ScalaCheck	No		Similar to QuickCheck.
ScalaTest			Scalable Test Framework - supports different styles of testing: TDD, BDD, and more. Supports Scala.js.
ScUnit			JUnit-style testing with fixture method injection and matchers for assertion.
specs2			Behavior Driven Development
μTest			Supports Scala.js

=== Scilab ===
Name	xUnit	Source	Remarks
Scilab test_run	Yes		Provided by default by Scilab

=== Shell ===
Name	xUnit	Source	Remarks
assert.sh			LGPL licensed. Lightweight.
bash_unit			bash unit testing enterprise edition framework for professionals. GPL-3.0 License
bats			the Bash Automated Testing System. TAP-compliant. MIT license
ATF			BSD license. Originally developed for NetBSD operating system but works well in most Unix-like platforms. Ability to install tests as part of a release.
jshu			Simplified Shell Unit Testing for Jenkins/Hudson
Roundup	No		
ShUnit	Yes		
shUnit2	Yes		Originally developed for log4sh
filterunit			Test framework for filters and other command-line programs
ShellSpec			BDD style unit testing framework. Supports all POSIX compliant shells including Bash, Dash, Ksh and Zsh. Nestable blocks that realize local scope and easy mocking. Parallel execution. RSpec-like/TAP/JUnit XML Reporter. Code coverage integration. MIT license.

=== Simulink ===
Name	xUnit	Source	Remarks
slUnit			
Simulink Test			Test execution, test assessment, reporting.
TPT	Yes		Time Partition Testing: Automated interface analysis, testframe generation, test execution, test assessment, reporting. For Simulink (or TargetLink) models under test, TPT supports automatic test frame generation including automatic interface analysis as well as automatic test execution, evaluation and logging. Back-to-back tests can be executed automatically between MiL and SiL.

=== Smalltalk ===
Name	xUnit	Source	Remarks
SUnit	Yes		The original source of the xUnit design

=== Structured Query Language (SQL), Database procedural languages ===
==== SQL ====
Name	xUnit	Source	Remarks
SQLUnit			
DbFit			Compare FitNesse.

==== MySQL ====
Name	xUnit	Source	Remarks
STK/Unit	Yes		
MyTAP	Yes		
utMySQL	Yes		

==== Procedural Language for SQL (PL/SQL) ====
Name	xUnit	Source	Remarks	Active
utPLSQL	Yes		Originally developed by Steven Feuerstein, the current version is a completely rewrite by various developers, an open source unit testing framework for PL/SQL development inspired by the JUnit and xUnit frameworks. Has a rich assertion library, and generates code coverage reports as well. Tests can be run straight from the database, or using the command-line interface that is part of the project.	Yes
Code Tester for Oracle			A commercial PL/SQL testing tool originally from Quest Software (the makers of Toad) and Steven Feuerstein. Quest Software was acquired by Dell in 2012 to form Dell Software. On November 1, 2016, the sale of Dell Software to Francisco Partners and Elliott Management Corporation was completed, and the company relaunched as Quest Software.	Yes
SQL Developer			Oracle includes a Unit Tester as part of the free SQL Developer application.	Yes
pl/unit			PL/Unit is a unit testing framework that provides the functionality to create unit tests for PL/SQL code. PL/Unit is expressed as one package that is compiled into the database and made available for use by PL/SQL unit tests.	No
PL/SQL Unit Testing for Oracle (PLUTO)	Yes		Open source unit testing framework modeled after JUnit and based on the Oracle PL/SQL object system	No
ruby-plsql-spec	Yes		PL/SQL unit testing with Ruby open source libraries	Yes
DBFit			Write, manage and execute tests directly from the browser. DbFit is written on top of FitNesse, a mature, fully featured framework with a large community.	Yes

==== IBM Db2 SQL PL ====
Name	xUnit	Source	Remarks	Active
db2unit	Yes		db2unit is an OpenSource framework developed for DB2 LUW. It is a xUnit/jUnit style framework for SQL-PL routines and it requires DB2 v9.7 or higher.	Yes

==== PostgreSQL ====
Name	xUnit	TAP	Source	Remarks	Active
Epic				Epic is a unit test framework for PostgreSQL stored procedures. It requires PG 8.1 or higher.	No
pgTAP	Yes	Yes		Write tests in SQL or xUnit-style functions.	Yes
PGtools				Schema loading and testing tools for PostgreSQL.	No
PGUnit	Yes	No		xUnit-style framework for stored procedures.	No

==== Transact-SQL ====
Name	xUnit	Source	Remarks
tSQLt	Yes		Includes mocking framework, continuous integration support and uses SQL Test as a GUI
TSQLUnit	Yes		
utTSQL	Yes		
Visual Studio Team Edition for Database Professionals			
Alcyone SQL Unit	Yes		Includes GUI for writing tests and maintaining data table files.
T.S.T.			
Slacker	Yes		Based on RSpec

=== Swift ===
Name	xUnit	Source	Remarks
Quick			A behavior-driven development test framework for Swift and Objective-C.
Sleipnir			A BDD-style framework for Swift.
XCTest	Yes		Derived from OCUnit.

=== SystemVerilog ===
Name	xUnit	Source	Remarks
SVUnit			SVUnit: SVUnit is a unit test framework for developers writing code in SystemVerilog.
VUnit	Yes		VUnit is an open source unit testing framework for VHDL and SystemVerilog

=== TargetLink ===
Name	xUnit	Source	Remarks
TPT			Time Partition Testing: For TargetLink models under test, TPT supports automatic test frame generation including automatic interface analysis as well as automatic test execution, evaluation and logging. Back-to-back tests can be executed automatically between MiL and SiL.

=== Tcl ===
Name	xUnit	Source	Remarks
tcltest			
tclUnit	Yes		
t-unit			

=== TinyOS, nesC ===
Name	xUnit	Source	Remarks
TUnit	Yes		Embedded multi-platform wireless testing and characterization

=== TypeScript ===
Name	xUnit	Source	Remarks
tsUnit	Yes		
Oscar	Yes		
Alsatian	Yes		
fast-check			Similar to QuickCheck.
Testy.Ts			TypesScript test framework running on node.js

=== VHSIC Hardware Description Language (VHDL) ===
Name	xUnit	Source	Remarks
VUnit	Yes		VUnit is an open source unit testing framework for VHDL and SystemVerilog

=== Visual FoxPro ===
Name	xUnit	Source	Remarks
FoxUnit			

=== XML (Extensible Markup Language) ===
Name	xUnit	Source	Remarks
XUnit			for testing: native XML programs, individual XSLT templates, and Java programs that deal with XML data
WUnit			for testing Web applications: tests are written in XML/XPath (XUnit), AJAX applications are supported, can also test server-side functions if they are made with Java servlets (for example, it is possible to store authoritatively an object in the user session server-side without sending an HTTP request and then get with HTTP the page that renders it)
SOAtest	No		Commercial. Parasoft's full-lifecycle quality platform for ensuring secure, reliable, compliant business processes.
XMLUnit	Yes		Plugin for JUnit and NUnit, allowing Assertion-style tests to be written for XSLT documents in Java or C#
Vibz Automation	No		Open Source. Vibzworld's Fully featured Open source test framework.

=== Extensible Stylesheet Language Transformations (XSLT) ===
Name	xUnit	Source	Remarks
juxy			a library for unit testing XSLT stylesheets from Java
Tennison Tests			allows to write unit-tests in XML, exercising XSLT from Apache Ant. When incorporated in a continuous integration environment, it allows to run multiple XSLT tests as part of a build, failing the build when they go wrong.
UTF-X			unit testing framework for XSLT that strongly supports the test-first-design principle with test rendition and test validation features
XMLUnit	Yes		Plugin for JUnit and NUnit, allowing Assertion-style tests to be written for XSLT documents in Java or C#
XSLTunit			Proof of concept unit testing framework for XSLT
XSpec			XSpec is a Behavior Driven Development (BDD) framework for XSLT and XQuery. It is based on the Spec framework of RSpec, which is a BDD framework for Ruby.
Another XSLTUnit			This framework allow develop your XSLTs and validate the outputs against XSD files, It supports Maven 3 and JUnit reports.

== See also ==
- Behavior-driven development – Collaborative approach to designing and developing software
- Extreme programming – Software development methodology
- List of GUI testing tools
- Mock object – Software object that mimics a real object
- Software testing – Checking software against expectations
- Test-driven development – Method of writing code
- Unit testing – Validating the behavior of isolated source code
- xUnit – Class of similar unit testing frameworks
