= Google Test =

C++ testing framework by Google

- Developer: Google
- Stable release: 1.18.0 / August 10, 2026; 22 days ago
- Written in: C++
- Operating system: Windows, Linux, macOS
- Type: Unit testing tool
- License: BSD 3-clause
- Website: google.github.io/googletest/
- Repository: github.com/google/googletest/

Google Test, often written as GoogleTest and referred to as gtest, is a library used to conduct unit testing in the programming language C++. Google Test is based on the xUnit architecture, a systematic methodology for assessing software components. Google Test is free and open-source software with a BSD 3-clause license.

Google Test can be compiled for multiple computer operating systems (OS), including those using the Portable Operating System Interface (POSIX; e.g., Linux, macOS), a set of standard OS interfaces, and Microsoft Windows. This allows for the execution of unit tests on both C and C++ codebases with few alterations to the source code.

== Projects using Google Test ==
Besides being developed and used at Google, many other projects implement Google Test as well:

- Android Open Source Project operating system
- Chromium projects (behind the Chrome browser and ChromeOS)
- LLVM compiler
- Protocol Buffers (Google's data interchange format)
- OpenCV computer vision library
- Robot Operating System
- GROMACS molecular dynamics simulation package

== Related tools ==
Google Test UI is a software tool for testing computer programs, and serves as a test runner. It employs a 'test binary', a compiled program responsible for executing tests and analyzing their results, to evaluate software functions. It visually presents the testing progress via a progress bar and displays a list of identified issues or 'test failures'. The tool is primarily written in C#. A Visual Studio extension, Google Test Adapter, integrates the framework within the Visual Studio environment.

== See also ==
- List of unit testing frameworks
- CppUnit
