= FUnit =

Unit testing framework

FUnit is an open-source unit testing framework developed at NASA’s Langley Research Center, specifically designed for the Fortran programming language versions 90, 95, and 2003. It is modeled after other testing frameworks within the xUnit family. The software aims to facilitate reliable, automated unit-testing, thereby improving robustness and quality in Fortran software development projects.

As of 2019, active development ceased, and the official source repository has been archived on GitHub, indicating maintenance discontinuation. The repository’s last commit dates back to October 2, 2014, reflecting that the project has not been actively maintained for many years.
