= Dynamic testing =

In software development, dynamic testing (or dynamic analysis) is examining the runtime response from a software system to particular input (test case).

Tests can be run manually or via automation.

Unit testing, integration testing, system testing, regression testing and acceptance testing are forms of dynamic testing.

In contrast to static testing, the software must be runnable.

== Evaluation ==
Advocates for dynamic testing cite that it can help identify weak areas in a runtime environment, supports application analysis even when the tester cannot access the source code, that it can identify vulnerabilities that are difficult to find via static testing, and that it can verify the correctness of static testing results.

However, critics of dynamic testing cite that automated testing tools may give wrong security, that automated testing tools can generate false positives and negatives, and that dynamic testing makes it more expensive to fix bugs, as tracking them down can be more difficult, taking longer than needed.

== See also ==
- Dynamic load testing
- Dynamic program analysis
- Time partition testing, a model-based testing methodology for the reactive test of dynamical or control systems.
- Daikon, a dynamic invariant generator.
