= XUnit.net =

Software testing framework for .NET software framework

xUnit.net

- xUnit.net 1.9.1 GUI on Windows
- Original author(s): James Newkirk, Brad Wilson
- Developer(s): Microsoft, Outercurve Foundation, .NET Foundation
- Stable release: 2.6.2 / November 18, 2023; 16 months ago
- Repository: github.com/xunit/xunit/
- Written in: C#
- Operating system: Windows, macOS, Linux
- Platform: .NET Framework, .NET Core, Mono
- Type: Unit testing tool
- License: Apache License 2.0
- Website: xunit.net

xUnit.net is a free and open-source unit testing tool for the .NET Framework, written by the original author of NUnit. The software can also be used with .NET Core and Mono.

It is licensed under Apache License 2.0, and the source code is available on GitHub. xUnit.net works with Xamarin, ReSharper, CodeRush, and TestDriven.NET. It is authored by James Newkirk and Brad Wilson.

== Example ==
Example of an xUnit.net test fixture:

using Xunit;

public class MyTests
{
    [Fact]
    public void MyTest()
    {
        Assert.Equal(4, 2 + 2);
    }
}

After you compile the test, run it in your console:

C:\MyTests\bin\Debug>xunit.console MyTestLibrary.dll
xUnit.net console test runner (64-bit .NET 2.0.50727.0)
Copyright (C) 2007-11 Microsoft Corporation.

xunit.dll:     Version 1.9.1.0
Test assembly: C:\MyTests\bin\Debug\MyTestLibrary.dll

1 total, 0 failed, 0 skipped, took 0.302 seconds

== See also ==
- Test automation
- List of unit testing frameworks for .NET programming languages (includes column indicating which are based on xUnit)
- JUnit
