= TestDox =

TestDox is a documentation generator for Java to create an overview of test case methods written for the JUnit unit testing framework presented as full sentences. Created by Chris Stevenson in 2003, to date versions exist for .NET, PHP and Ruby. The term testdox format refers to the naming convention used for the test methods.

== See also ==
- Behavior driven development (or BDD)
- JUnit
- PHPUnit
- rSpec
