= Symfony =

PHP web application framework for MVC applications

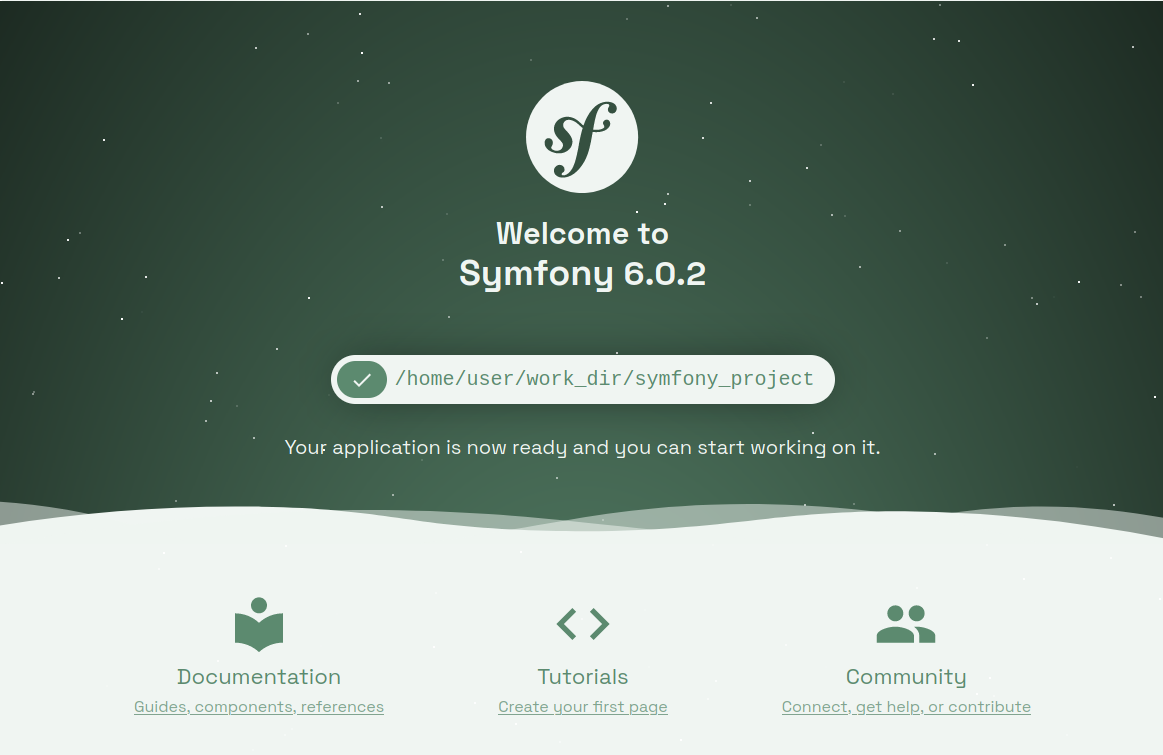
- Symfony Welcome Page Symfony Welcome Page
- Original author: Fabien Potencier
- Developer: Symfony community
- Release: 22 October 2005; 20 years ago
- Stable release: 8.1.4 / 2026-08-07[±]
- Written in: PHP
- Operating system: Cross-platform
- Type: Web application framework
- License: MIT License
- Website: symfony.com
- Repository: Symfony Repository

Symfony is a free and open-source PHP web application framework and a set of reusable PHP component libraries. It was published as free software on October 18, 2005, and released under the MIT License.

== Goal ==
Symfony aims to speed up the creation and maintenance of web applications and to replace repetitive coding tasks. It's also aimed at building robust applications in an enterprise context, and aims to give developers full control over the configuration: from the directory structure to third-party libraries, almost everything can be customized. To match enterprise development guidelines, Symfony is bundled with additional tools to help developers test, debug and document projects.

Symfony has a low performance overhead used with a bytecode cache.

== Technical ==
Symfony was heavily inspired by the Spring Framework.

It makes heavy use of existing PHP open-source projects as part of the framework, including:

- PDO database abstraction layer (1.1, with Doctrine and Propel 1.3)
- PHPUnit, a unit testing framework
- Twig, a templating engine

Symfony also makes use of its own components, which are freely available on the Symfony Components site for various other projects:

- Symfony YAML, a YAML parser based upon Spyc
- Symfony Event Dispatcher
- Symfony Dependency Injector, a dependency injector
- Symfony Templating, a templating engine

== Sponsors ==
Symfony is sponsored by SensioLabs, a French software developer and professional services provider. The first name was Sensio Framework, and all classes were therefore prefixed with sf. Later, when it was decided to launch it as an open-source framework, the brainstorming resulted in the name symfony (renamed to Symfony from version 2 onward), which matched the existing theme and class name prefixes.

== Real-world usage ==
- Symfony is used by the open-source Q&A service Askeet and many more applications, including Delicious website.
- At one time it was used for 20 million users of Yahoo! Bookmarks.
- As of February 2009, Dailymotion.com has ported part of its code to use Symfony, and is continuing the transition.
- Symfony is used by OpenSky, a social shopping platform, and the Symfony framework is also used by the massively multiplayer online browser game eRepublik, and by the content management framework eZ Publish in version 5.
- Drupal 8, phpBB and a number of other large applications have incorporated components of Symfony.
- Symfony is also used by Meetic, one of the largest online dating platforms in the world, on most of its websites for implementing its business logic in the backend.
- Symfony components are also used in other web application frameworks including Laravel, which is another full-stack framework, and Silex, which is a microframework.
- Vogue Paris's website is also built on the Symfony framework

Symfony's own website has a comprehensive list of projects using Symfony and a showcase of websites built with Symfony.

== Releases ==
Symfony manages its releases through a time-based model; a new Symfony release comes out every six months: one in May and one in November. This release process has been adopted as of Symfony 2.2, and all the "rules" explained in this document must be strictly followed as of Symfony 2.4.

The standard version of Symfony is maintained for eight months, whereas long-term support (LTS) versions are supported for three years. A new LTS release is published biennially.

As of October 2026, the latest stable release is version 8.1 and the current LTS release is version 7.4.

Color	Meaning
Red	Release no longer supported
Amber	security fixes only
Green	Release still supported
Blue	Future release

Version	Release date	Support	PHP version	End of maintenance	Notes
1.0	January 2007	Three years	≥ 5.0	January 2010	
1.1	June 2008	One year	≥ 5.1	June 2009	Security-related patches were applied until June 2010
1.2	December 2008	One year	≥ 5.2	November 2009	
1.3	November 2009	One year	≥ 5.2.4	November 2010	
1.4	November 2009	Three years	≥ 5.2.4	November 2012	LTS version. 1.4 is identical to 1.3, but it does not support the 1.3 deprecated features.
2.0	July 2011		≥ 5.3.2	March 2013	Last 2.0.x release was Symfony 2.0.25
2.1	September 2012	Eight months	≥ 5.3.3	June 2013	More components are part of the stable API.
2.2	March 2013	Eight months	≥ 5.3.3	November 2013	Various new features.
2.3	June 2013	Three years	≥ 5.3.3	May 2016	The first LTS release, only three months development, normally six months.
2.4	November 2013	Eight months	≥ 5.3.3	July 2014	The first 2.x branch release with complete backwards compatibility.
2.5	May 2014	Eight months	≥ 5.3.3	January 2015	
2.6	November 2014	Eight months	≥ 5.3.3	July 2015	
2.7	May 2015	Three years	≥ 5.3.9	May 2018	LTS release.
2.8	November 2015	Three years	≥ 5.3.9	November 2018	LTS release.
3.0	November 2015	Eight months	≥ 5.5.9	July 2016	
3.1	May 2016	Eight months	≥ 5.5.9	January 2017	
3.2	November 2016	Eight months	≥ 5.5.9	July 2017	
3.3	June 2017	Eight months	≥ 5.5.9	January 2018	
3.4	November 2017	Three years	≥ 5.5.9	November 2020	LTS release.
4.0	November 2017	Eight months	≥ 7.1.3	July 2018	Dropping support for HHVM
4.1	May 2018	Eight months	≥ 7.1.3	January 2019	
4.2	November 2018	Eight months	≥ 7.1.3	July 2019	
4.3	May 2019	Eight months	≥ 7.1.3	January 2020	
4.4	November 2019	Three years	≥ 7.1.3	November 2022	LTS release.
5.0	November 2019	Eight months	≥ 7.2.5	July 2020	Live released by Fabien Potencier during his Keynote at SymfonyCon Amsterdam (11/21/19).
5.1	May 2020	Eight months	≥ 7.2.5	January 2021	
5.2	November 2020	Eight months	≥ 7.2.5	July 2021	
5.3	May 2021	Eight months	≥ 7.2.5	January 2022	Stable release.
5.4	November 2021	Three years	≥ 7.2.5	November 2024	LTS release; security releases available until February 2029
6.0	November 2021	Eight months	≥ 8.0.2	January 2023	Maintenance period extended by six months.
6.1	May 2022	Eight months	≥ 8.1	January 2023	
6.2	November 2022	Eight months	≥ 8.1	July 2023	
6.3	May 2023	Eight months	≥ 8.1	January 2024	
6.4	November 2023	Three years	≥ 8.1	November 2027	LTS release.
7.0	November 2023	Eight months	≥ 8.2	July 2024	
7.1	May 2024	Eight months	≥ 8.2	January 2025	
7.2	November 2024	Eight months	≥ 8.2	July 2025	
7.3	May 2025	Eight months	≥ 8.2	January 2026	
7.4	November 2025	Three years	≥ 8.2	November 2028	LTS release; security releases available until November 2029
8.0	November 2025	Eight months	≥ 8.4	July 2026	
8.1	May 2026	Eight months	≥ 8.4	January 2027	

== See also ==
- Comparison of server-side web frameworks
- Lime, a Test framework for Symfony 1
- Zend Framework
