= SUnit =

SUnit is an automated testing framework written by Kent Beck in 1989. It was originally intended for unit testing, and often used for this purpose. It supports testing Smalltalk code via test code also written in Smalltalk.

SUnit was adapted for Java as JUnit which became notably popular. Subsequently, adaptations were created for many other languages; many also popular.

Frameworks with similar design are labeled xUnit.

== History ==
SUnit was originally described by Beck in "Simple Smalltalk Testing: With Patterns" (1989), then published as chapter 30 "Simple Smalltalk Testing", in the book Kent Beck's Guide to Better Smalltalk by Kent Beck, Donald G. Firesmith (Editor) (Publisher: Cambridge University Press, Pub. Date: December 1998, ISBN 978-0-521-64437-2, 408pp)
