= XUnit =

Class of similar unit testing frameworks

xUnit is a label used for an automated testing software framework that shares significant structure and functionality that is traceable to a common progenitor SUnit.

The SUnit framework was ported to Java by Kent Beck and Erich Gamma as JUnit which gained wide popularity. Adaptations to other languages were also popular which led some to claim that the structured, object-oriented style works well with popular languages including Java and C#.

The name of an adaptation is often a variation of "SUnit" with the "S" replaced with an abbreviation of the target language name. For example, JUnit for Java and RUnit for R. The term "xUnit" refers to any such adaptation where "x" is a placeholder for the language-specific prefix.

The xUnit frameworks are often used for unit testing – testing an isolated unit of code – but can be used for any level of software testing including integration and system.

== Architecture ==
An xUnit framework has the following general architecture.

=== Test case ===
A test case is the smallest part of a test that generally encodes a simple path through the software under test. The test case code prepares input data and environmental state, invokes the software under test and verifies expected results.

A programmer writes the code for each test case.

=== Assertions ===
A test case is implemented with one or more assertions that validate expected results.

Generally, the framework provides assertion functionality. A framework may provide a way to use custom assertions.

=== Test suite ===
A test suite is a collection of related test cases. They share a framework which allows for reuse of environment setup and cleanup code.

Generally, a test runner may run the cases of a suite in any order so the programmer should not depend on top-to-bottom execution order.

=== Test fixture ===
A test fixture (also known as a test context) provides the environment for each test case of a suite. Generally, a fixture is configured to setup a known, good, runtime environment before tests run, and to cleanup the environment after.

The fixture is configured with one or more functions that setup and cleanup state. The test runner runs each setup function before each case and runs each cleanup function after.

=== Test runner ===
A test runner is a program that runs tests and reports results. The program is often part of a framework.

A test runner may produce results in various formats. Often, a common and default format is human-readable, plain-text. Additionally, the runner may produce structured output. Some xUnit adaptations (i.e. JUnit) can output XML that can be used by a continuous integration system such as Jenkins and Atlassian Bamboo.

== See also ==
- Extreme programming – Software development methodology
- List of unit testing frameworks
- Software testing – Checking software against a standard
- Test-driven development – Method of writing code
- Test Anything Protocol – Software testing protocol
- Unit testing – Validating the behavior of isolated source code
