= Comparison of continuous integration software =

This is a compendium of software tools that support continuous integration.

== Features ==
Name	Platform	License	Builders: Windows	Builders: Java	Builders: other	Notification	Integration, IDEs	Integration, other
AppVeyor	Hosted, Self-Hosted	Proprietary	Visual Studio, MSBuild, Psake	No	Custom Script, PowerShell	Email, HipChat, Slack	No	GitHub, Bitbucket, Kiln, Windows Azure
Azure DevOps Server (formerly TFS and VSTS)	Cross-platform	Proprietary, MIT	MSBuild, Visual Studio	Ant, Maven, Gradle, Android	C, C++, Go, Groovy, Java, Node.js, Perl, PHP, Python, Ruby	Email, SOAP	Visual Studio, Eclipse, IntelliJ IDEA, Android Studio, Visual Studio Code	GitHub, Jenkins, Slack, Hipchat, FindBugs, Checkstyle, PMD
Bamboo	Web container	Proprietary	MSBuild, NAnt, Visual Studio	Ant, Maven 1-2-3	Custom script, command-line tool, Bash, Xcode, Phing, Grunt, Grails	XMPP, Google Talk, Email, RSS, Remote API, HipChat	IntelliJ IDEA, Eclipse, Visual Studio	FishEye, Jira, Clover, Bitbucket, GitHub
Buildbot	Python	GPL	Command-line	Command-line	Command-line	Email, Web, GUI, IRC	Unknown	Unknown
Buildkite	Hosted, Self-Hosted	MIT	Command-line	Unknown	Ubuntu, Debian, Red Hat/CentOS, FreeBSD, macOS, Linux, Docker, AWS, Elastic CI Stack for AWS, Google Cloud	Email, Basecamp, Slack, webhooks, pagerduty	Unknown	Okta, Google Workspace, GitHub, Azure AD, custom SAML, GraphQL, Amazon EventBridge, CC Menu, CCTray, Artifactory
CircleCI	Hosted, Self-Hosted	Proprietary	Command-line	Command-line	Command-line	Email	Visual Studio Code	GitHub, Bitbucket, GitLab
GitLab	Hosted, Self-Hosted	Proprietary, MIT	Yes	Maven, Gradle	SSH, Shell, VirtualBox, Parallels, Docker, Kubernetes, Custom	Email, Web, Slack and others	Gitpod, WebIDE	Many
GoCD	Cross-platform	Apache 2.0	Command-line	Command-line	Command-line	Email, hipchat, Slack, Gerrit, Gitter, Riemann etc	No	GitHub
Harness	Hosted, Self-Hosted	Proprietary, Apache 2.0	Yes (Windows containers/VMs)	Maven, Gradle, Bazel	Docker container steps; Go, Node.js, Python, Rust, .NET, Android, shell/command-line	Email, Slack, Microsoft Teams, PagerDuty, Webhooks, Datadog	Cursor, Claude, Antigravity, Kiro, Visual Studio Code, JetBrains IDEs (via Gitspaces)	GitHub, GitLab, Bitbucket, Azure Repos, Jira, Slack, Docker, Helm, Kubernetes, 100+ integrations
Jenkins	Web container	Creative Commons and MIT	MSBuild, NAnt, Batch Script	Ant, Maven 2, Kundo	CMake, Gant, Gradle, Grails, Phing, Rake, Ruby, SCons, Python, shell script, command-line	Android, Email, Google Calendar, IRC, XMPP, RSS, Twitter, Slack, CCMenu, CCTray	Eclipse, IntelliJ IDEA, NetBeans	Bugzilla, Google Code, Jira, Bitbucket, Redmine, FindBugs, Checkstyle, PMD and Mantis, Trac, HP ALM
OpenMake Software Meister	Cross-platform	Proprietary	MSBuild, NAnt, Visual Studio	Ant, Maven 1-2-3	Shell script, batch script, cross-platform command-line, Groovy, Make, RTC Jazz, TFS Build, Custom Script Interpreter	Email, XMPP, RSS, Systray	Eclipse, Visual Studio	Bugzilla, Google Code, Jira, Bitbucket, Redmine, FindBugs, Checkstyle, PMD and Mantis, Trac
Semaphore (software)	Hosted	Proprietary	No	Maven, Gradle	Ruby, Java, Python, Node.js, PHP, Clojure, C/C++, Elixir, Erlang, Go, Rake, command-line	Email, Campfire, HipChat, Slack, Flowdock, Webhooks, Remote API	Unknown	GitHub, Bitbucket, Heroku, AWS, Code Climate, Cloud 66
Travis CI	Hosted	Proprietary	No	Ant, Maven, Gradle	C, C++, Clojure, Elixir, Erlang, Go, Groovy, Haskell, Java, Node.js, Perl, PHP, Python, Ruby, Rust, Scala, Smalltalk	Email, Campfire, HipChat, IRC, Slack, CCMenu, CCTray	No	GitHub, Heroku
TeamCity	Web container	Proprietary	MSBuild, NAnt, Visual Studio, ReSharper-based .NET code analysis	Ant, Maven 2-3, Gradle, IntelliJ IDEA-based build and code analysis	command-line, PowerShell, Xcode, Rake, FxCop	Email, XMPP, RSS, IDE, SysTray	Eclipse, Visual Studio, IntelliJ IDEA, RubyMine, PyCharm, PhpStorm, WebStorm	JetBrains YouTrack, Jira, Bugzilla, FishEye, FindBugs, PMD, dotCover, NCover
Vexor	Hosted	Proprietary	No	Unknown	Ruby, Clojure, Scala, Python, Node.js, Go, Rust, Haskell	Email, HipChat, Slack	Unknown	GitHub, Bitbucket, GitLab

== Version control support ==
The following table compares notable continuous integration software on the basis of version control support.

Name	AccuRev	BitKeeper	CA Harvest	ClearCase	CVS	Darcs	Git	GNU Bazaar	Integrity	Mercurial	Perforce	Plastic	PVCS	StarTeam	Subversion	Surround	Synergy	Team Concert	TFVC	Vault	Visual SourceSafe
AppVeyor	No	No	No	No	No	No	Yes	No	No	Yes	No	No	No	No	Yes	No	No	No	No	No	No
Azure DevOps Server	No	No	No	No	No	No	Yes	No	No	No	No	No	No	No	Yes	No	No	No	Yes	No	No
Bamboo	Yes	No	No	Yes	Yes	No	Yes	No	No	Yes	Yes	No	No	No	Yes	No	No	No	Yes	No	No
BuildBot	No	No	No	No	Yes	Yes	Yes	Yes	No	Yes	Yes	No	No	No	Yes	No	No	No	No	No	No
Harness	No	No	No	No	No	No	Yes	No	No	No	No	No	No	No	No	No	No	No	No	No	No
Jenkins	Yes	Yes	Yes	Yes	Yes	Yes	Yes	Yes	Yes	Yes	Yes	Yes	Yes	Yes	Yes	Yes	Yes	Yes	Yes	Yes	Yes
OpenMake Software Meister	Yes	No	Yes	Yes	Yes	No	Yes	No	Yes	No	Yes	No	Yes	Yes	Yes	No	Yes	Yes	Yes	Yes	Yes
Semaphore (software)	No	No	No	No	No	No	Yes	No	No	No	No	No	No	No	No	No	No	No	No	No	No
TeamCity	Yes	No	No	Yes	Yes	No	Yes	Yes	No	Yes	Yes	No	No	Yes	Yes	No	No	No	Yes	Yes	Yes
Vexor	No	No	No	No	No	No	Yes	No	No	No	No	No	No	No	No	No	No	No	No	No	No

== See also ==
- List of build automation software
