= Probo =

User automated testing tool

- Industry: Web development
- Founders: Alex Urevick-Ackelsberg, Jody Hamilton
- Headquarters: Philadelphia
- Services: User Automated Testing
- Parent: Zivtech
- Website: probo.ci

Probo is a user automated testing tool that provides continuous integration, workflow organization and quality assurance using the same tool for project managers and developers.

Probo expands upon the automated testing functionality of many other CI tools by providing a quality assurance environment where users can manually review the look and feel of changes before committing them.

== History ==
Probo was initially developed as a tool for internal use by its parent company, Zivtech, to improve upon the offerings of other CI tools. Once the founders realized that it filled a gap in the industry, they expanded it into a separate offering as a better way to automate the process, involve clients and project managers in the earliest stages, and reduce the cycle of testing and approval.

Probo (by definition: demonstrate, test, approve) is an open source tool that has been built to work with Drupal, integrates into GitHub and posts statuses of the builds to GitHub PR. The tool itself is written in Node.js and powered by Docker.

Probo was the first CI tool to provide a quality assurance environment where users can manually review their changes.

== Other frameworks ==
Based on the original Jenkins for Java, there are now similar tools for other programming frameworks such as:

- Buildbot — a Python system to automate the compile/test cycle to validate code changes.
- Tox — an automation tool providing packaging, testing and deployment of Python software.
- Travis-CI — a distributed CI server which builds tests for open source projects for free.
- Django-Jenkins — Django (Python) Web Framework integration with Jenkins.

See Continuous Integration for more.

== See also ==
- Continuous integration software
