= TeamCity =

Build management and continuous integration server

- Developer: JetBrains
- Initial release: 2 October 2006; 19 years ago
- Stable release: 2025.11
- Written in: Java
- Operating system: server-based Web application
- Type: Continuous integration, Continuous delivery, Build automation
- License: Proprietary commercial software, Freeware for teams meeting supplier conditions
- Website: www.jetbrains.com/teamcity/

TeamCity is a build management and continuous integration/continuous delivery (CI/CD) server developed by JetBrains. First released on October 2, 2006, TeamCity is designed to help development teams automate the build, test, and deployment processes for software projects across multiple platforms and technologies. TeamCity operates under a freemium licensing model, offering a free tier with up to 100 build configurations and three Build Agent licenses, while open-source projects can request completely free licenses. Enterprise features require paid licensing.

== Overview ==
TeamCity serves as a centralized platform for DevOps practices, enabling teams to implement continuous integration and continuous delivery workflows. The system monitors version control systems for changes and automatically triggers builds, tests, and deployments based on configurable rules and triggers. Its web-based interface provides comprehensive visibility into build status, test results, code quality metrics, and deployment pipelines. The platform is built using Java and runs as a server application that can be deployed on-premises or in cloud environments. TeamCity supports distributed build processing through its Build Agent architecture, allowing teams to scale their CI/CD infrastructure across multiple machines and environments.

== Key Features ==
=== Build Management ===
- Flexible Build Configurations: Support for complex build chains with dependencies, parallel execution, and conditional logic
- Build Templates: Reusable configuration templates to standardize build processes across projects
- Artifact Management: Built-in artifact repository with versioning, cleanup policies, and dependency resolution
- Build Triggers: Multiple trigger types including VCS changes, schedule-based, dependency-based, and manual triggers
- Build Parameters: Configurable parameters for environment-specific builds and deployments

=== Continuous Integration & Testing ===
- Gated commits: Pre-commit validation that prevents developers from breaking the main branch by running builds on proposed changes before they are committed
- Parallel Build Execution: Distributed build processing across multiple Build Agents for faster feedback
- Test Integration: Native support for major testing frameworks with detailed reporting and history tracking
- Code Quality Analysis: Integrated code coverage, code inspections, and duplicate detection
- Flaky Test Detection: Automatic identification and tracking of unreliable tests

=== Development Environment Integration ===
- IDE Plugins: Native integrations with IntelliJ IDEA, Eclipse, Visual Studio, and other popular IDEs
- Pre-tested Commits: Developers can validate changes locally before committing to the repository
- Real-time Notifications: Build status notifications via email, Slack, and other communication channels
- Personal Builds: Private build validation for individual developers

=== Deployment & Release Management ===
Deployment Pipelines: Visual pipeline designer for complex deployment workflows Environment Management: Support for multiple deployment environments with promotion workflows Release Management: Integration with deployment tools and cloud platforms Rollback Capabilities: Automated rollback mechanisms for failed deployments

== Supported Technologies ==
=== Programming Languages & Platforms ===
- Java and JVM languages
- .NET and .NET Core
- JavaScript and Node.js
- Python
- Ruby
- Go
- C++ and C
- PHP
- Swift
- Kotlin

=== Build Tools & Package Managers ===
Comprehensive Language Support:

- Java and JVM languages (Scala, Groovy, Clojure)
- .NET Framework and .NET Core (C#, VB.NET, F#)
- JavaScript and Node.js
- Python
- Ruby
- Go
- C++ and C
- PHP
- Swift
- Kotlin

Build Tools & Package Managers Major Build Engines:

- Maven (Java ecosystem)
- Gradle (Java/Android ecosystem)
- MSBuild (.NET ecosystem)
- Apache Ant (Java ecosystem)

Game Development Engines

- Unity (C# scripting)
- Unreal Engine (C++, Blueprint visual scripting)
- Godot (GDScript, C#, C++)
- GameMaker Studio (GML)
- Construct
- Cocos2d (C++, JavaScript, Lua)
- Custom game engines and frameworks

Package Managers:

- npm and Yarn (JavaScript/Node.js)
- NuGet (.NET ecosystem)
- pip (Python)
- RubyGems (Ruby)

Additional Build Support

TeamCity also provides native support for:

- Docker containerization
- Kubernetes deployments
- Various testing frameworks across all supported languages
- Code coverage tools for quality analysis
- Static analysis tools for code inspection

== Version Control Systems ==
TeamCity supports comprehensive integration with major version control systems:

- Git (including GitHub, GitLab, Bitbucket)
- Mercurial (hg)
- Subversion (svn)
- Perforce
- Concurrent Versions System (CVS)
- Micro Focus StarTeam
- ClearCase (Base and UCM)
- Team Foundation Version Control (TFVC)
- Plastic SCM
- Visual SourceSafe (VSS)
- Vault

== Architecture ==
TeamCity follows a distributed architecture consisting of:

- TeamCity Server: Central management component that hosts the web interface, manages configurations, and coordinates builds
- Build Agents: Distributed workers that execute build tasks and report results back to the server
- Database: Persistent storage for build history, configurations, and metadata
- Artifact Storage: Repository for build outputs, dependencies, and deployment packages

This architecture enables horizontal scaling and supports hybrid cloud deployments.

== Benefits ==
=== For Development Teams ===
Faster Feedback Loops: Immediate notification of build failures and test results Quality Assurance: Automated code quality checks and comprehensive test reporting Collaboration: Shared visibility into project status and build history Developer Productivity: IDE integration and pre-commit validation reduce context switching

=== for Organizations ===
Risk Reduction: Automated testing and deployment validation minimize production issues Compliance: Audit trails, access controls, and deployment tracking support regulatory requirements Cost Efficiency: Reduced manual effort in build and deployment processes Scalability: Distributed architecture supports growing development teams and complex projects

== Comparison with Competitors ==
TeamCity competes with other CI/CD platforms such as Jenkins, GitLab CI/CD, GitHub Actions, Azure DevOps, and CircleCI.

Key differentiators include: User Experience: Intuitive web interface with extensive customization options JetBrains Ecosystem: Deep integration with JetBrains development tools Enterprise Features: Advanced security, compliance, and management capabilities Hybrid Deployment: Flexible on-premises and cloud deployment options

== Licensing ==
TeamCity offers several licensing tiers:

Professional: Free for up to 100 build configurations and 3 build agents Enterprise: Commercial license with unlimited build configurations and agents Open Source: Free licenses available for qualifying open-source projects Academic: Educational licenses for schools and universities

== See also ==
- Continuous Integration software
- Comparison of continuous integration software
- DevOps
- Continuous delivery
- Build automation
- JetBrains
