= AppVeyor =

- Developer(s): AppVeyor Systems Inc.
- Platform: Web
- Type: Continuous integration
- Website: www.appveyor.com

AppVeyor is a hosted, distributed continuous integration service used to build and test projects hosted on GitHub and other source code hosting services (including GitLab and Bitbucket) on a Microsoft Windows virtual machine, as well as Ubuntu Linux virtual machines. AppVeyor is a privately held Canadian corporation founded in 2011.

AppVeyor is configured using a Web UI, or by adding a file named appveyor.yml, which is a YAML format text file, to the root directory of the code repository.

Azure DevOps includes AppVeyor integration.

On 12 November 2014 Microsoft released many parts of their .NET Framework as open-source .NET Core on GitHub, and AppVeyor integration was added to some of these repositories.

== See also ==
- Jenkins
- Travis CI
- Comparison of continuous integration software
