= Self-healing test automation =

AI-driven technique for automatic repair

Self-healing test automation is a technique in software testing in which automated test scripts automatically detect, diagnose, and repair failures caused by changes in the application under test — without requiring manual intervention from a software engineer or QA professional. The approach relies on artificial intelligence (AI) and machine learning (ML) methods to identify new or changed user interface elements at runtime and update broken locators accordingly, maintaining test suite stability in the face of continuous software changes.

== Background ==
In conventional test automation, test scripts interact with a web or mobile application through locators — identifiers such as XPath expressions, CSS selectors, or element IDs that point to specific Document Object Model (DOM) nodes. When the application's UI is updated, these locators frequently become invalid, causing tests to throw exceptions (such as NoSuchElementException in Selenium) and marking builds as failed even when no actual defect exists. This phenomenon is closely related to the broader problem of flaky tests.

Studies have found that broken locators can account for 15–20% or more of all automated test failures in actively developed applications, creating a significant and ongoing maintenance burden for QA teams.

== Mechanism ==
Self-healing frameworks typically operate in three stages:

1. Detection — The framework identifies a test failure caused by a broken locator at runtime, distinguishing it from failures caused by genuine application defects.
2. Healing — Using ML algorithms such as decision trees, random forests, cosine similarity, or reinforcement learning, the system searches the current DOM for the element most likely to correspond to the one originally referenced.
3. Update — The repaired locator is either applied for the current test run only, or written back into the test codebase so that future executions use the corrected value.

The healing step frequently involves storing a snapshot of the DOM state at the time each test was last known to pass, then performing a tree comparison between the stored and current DOM to identify the best matching node.

== Techniques ==
Several AI and ML techniques are employed in self-healing frameworks:

- Natural language processing (NLP) — used to match elements based on visible text, ARIA labels, and other semantic attributes, allowing the system to find a button labelled "Submit" even if its ID has changed.
- Reinforcement learning — used to train the system to select increasingly accurate locators over time based on feedback from past healing decisions.
- Anomaly detection — used to identify unexpected changes in the application's DOM structure that may indicate either a healing opportunity or an actual defect.
- Deep learning — architectures including convolutional neural networks (CNNs) have been applied to visual element identification, enabling healing based on the rendered appearance of UI components rather than their underlying code.

== Performance ==
Empirical evaluations of self-healing frameworks have reported substantial efficiency gains. A 2023 study using industry-standard applications found a 38% reduction in manual test maintenance effort and a 45% improvement in test execution stability following deployment of a self-healing ML agent framework.

A broader systematic review of peer-reviewed papers published between 2021 and 2025 confirmed that AI-based frameworks provide substantial gains in efficiency, performance, and reliability across diverse software domains, and that self-healing test scripts are among the most widely adopted AI solutions in industrial test automation practice.

An empirical comparison of traditional Selenium frameworks and self-healing equivalents found that the healing approach significantly reduced test brittleness in applications with frequent UI changes, particularly in continuous integration and continuous deployment (CI/CD) environments.

== Limitations and criticism ==
Self-healing test automation has attracted criticism as well as enthusiasm. A core concern is that healing mechanisms may mask genuine application defects: if a UI element has moved or been renamed because of a real regression, a self-healing framework may "fix" the locator and allow the test to pass when it should fail.

Other limitations identified in the research literature include:

- Difficulty in distinguishing between a changed locator and an actual functional defect, particularly when multiple similar elements are present on the same page.
- Dependence on high-quality historical DOM snapshots and labelled training data, which may not be available for legacy systems.
- Integration complexity within existing CI/CD pipelines and toolchains, especially for large enterprise test suites.

== See also ==
- Software testing
- Test automation
- Continuous testing
- Selenium (software)
- AI-assisted software development
