= Evinced =

Palo Alto web and mobile accessibility testing software company, founded 2018

- Type: Private
- Industry: Software development
- Founded: 2018; 8 years ago in Palo Alto, California
- Founders: Navin Thadani, Gal Moav
- Headquarters: Palo Alto, California, U.S.
- Key people: Navin Thadani (CEO), Gal Moav (Israel General Manager)
- Products: Accessibility software
- Website: www.evinced.com

Evinced is an American software company that develops tools for monitoring and correcting accessibility issues in websites and mobile applications. Founded in 2018, Evinced is led by co-founder and chief executive officer Navin Thadani.

== History ==
Evinced was co-founded in Palo Alto, California, in 2018 by Navin Thadani and Gal Moav. It launched publicly in 2021. The company develops software tools that monitor and offer corrections for accessibility issues in both new and existing websites and mobile applications, including through the integration of artificial intelligence and large language models. Evinced's products allow for continuous integration and real-time accessibility checks during each stage of development.

Evinced received US$17 million in its Series A funding round in 2021, US$38 million in Series B funding in 2022, and US$55 million in Series C funding in 2024. Thadani is the company's chief executive officer.
