= Apache Ivy =

Package management software

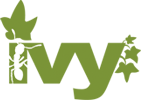
- Developer: Apache Software Foundation
- Stable release: 2.6.0 / July 15, 2026; 2 months ago
- Written in: Java
- Operating system: Cross-platform
- Platform: Java
- Type: Library dependency
- License: Apache License 2.0
- Website: ant.apache.org/ivy/
- Repository: Ivy Repository

Apache Ivy is a transitive package manager. It is a sub-project of the Apache Ant project, with which Ivy works to resolve project dependencies. An external XML file defines project dependencies and lists the resources necessary to build a project. Ivy then resolves and downloads resources from an artifact repository: either a private repository or one publicly available on the Internet.

To some degree, it competes with Apache Maven, which also manages dependencies. However, Maven is a complete build tool, whereas Ivy focuses purely on managing transitive dependencies.

== History ==
Jayasoft first created Ivy in September, 2004, with Xavier Hanin serving as the principal architect and developer of the project. Jayasoft moved hosting of Ivy (then at version 1.4.1) to Apache Incubator in October 2006. Since then, the project has undergone package renaming to reflect its association with the Apache Software Foundation. Package names prefixes of the form fr.jayasoft.ivy have become org.apache.ivy prefixes.

Ivy graduated from the Apache Incubator in October, 2007. As of 2009 it functions as a sub-project of Apache Ant. Over time, Ivy has been used in sbt (until sbt 1.3), grails (until 2014), gradle (until 2012), and Jenkins.

IvyDE, an Eclipse extension for Ivy, was archived in November 2023.

== Features ==
- Managing project dependencies
- XML-driven declaration of project dependencies and JAR repositories
- Automatic retrieval of transitive dependency definitions and resources
- Automatic integration to publicly available artifact repositories
- Resolution of dependency closures
- Configurable project state definitions, which allow for multiple dependency-set definitions
- Publishing of artifacts into a local enterprise repository

== See also ==
- Apache Maven, an alternative dependency management and build tool
