= MSBuild =

Build automation software

- Developers: Microsoft, .NET Foundation
- Initial release: 2003; 23 years ago
- Stable release: v17.8.3 / 15 November 2023; 2 years ago
- Written in: C#
- Operating system: Cross-platform
- Platform: .NET Framework, .NET
- Type: Build tool
- License: MIT License
- Website: docs.microsoft.com/visualstudio/msbuild/msbuild
- Repository: github.com/dotnet/msbuild

Microsoft Build Engine, or MSBuild, is a set of free and open-source build tools for managed code under the Common Language Infrastructure as well as native C and C++ code. It was first released in 2003 and was a part of .NET Framework. MSBuild is included with Visual Studio, but can also be run independently through MSBuild's command-line interface.

== Overview ==
MSBuild is a build tool that helps automate the process of creating a software product, including compiling the source code, packaging, testing, deployment and creating documentations. With MSBuild, it is possible to build Visual Studio projects and solutions without the Visual Studio IDE installed. MSBuild is free and open-source. MSBuild was previously bundled with .NET Framework; starting with Visual Studio 2013, however, it is bundled with Visual Studio instead. MSBuild is a functional replacement for the nmake utility, which remains in use in projects that originated in older Visual Studio releases.

MSBuild acts on MSBuild project files which have a similar XML syntax to Apache Ant or NAnt. Even though the syntax is based upon well-defined XML schema, the fundamental structure and operation is comparable to the traditional Unix make utility: the user specifies what will be used (typically source code files) and what the result should be (typically a static library, DLL or an executable application), but the utility itself decides what to do and the order in which to carry out the build.

MSBuild can build a project against a supported .NET Framework version of choice. This feature is called "multitargeting". Any given build of a project, however, can only target one version of the framework at a time.

== History ==
MSBuild was first created in 2003 targeting .NET Framework 2.0 for use in Visual Studio 2005 (codenamed Whidbey) and Windows Vista (codenamed Longhorn).

== Versions ==
Version	.NET Framework	Visual Studio Version	Usual Install Locations (x86)
2.0	2.0	2005	C:\Windows\Microsoft.NET\Framework\v2.0.50727
3.5	3.5	2008	C:\Windows\Microsoft.NET\Framework\v3.5
4.7.3062.0	4.0	2010	C:\Windows\Microsoft.NET\Framework\v4.0.30319
4.8.3761.0	4.5.2	2012	C:\Windows\Microsoft.NET\Framework\v4.0.30319
12.0	4.5.2	2013	C:\Program Files (x86)\MSBuild\12.0\Bin
14.0	4.6	2015	C:\Program Files (x86)\MSBuild\14.0\Bin
15.0	4.7	2017	C:\Program Files (x86)\Microsoft Visual Studio\2017\BuildTools\MSBuild\15.0\Bin; C:\Program Files (x86)\Microsoft Visual Studio\2017\Enterprise\MSBuild\15.0\Bin; C:\Program Files (x86)\Microsoft Visual Studio\2017\Community\MSBuild\15.0\Bin
16.0	4.7.2	2019	C:\Program Files (x86)\Microsoft Visual Studio\2019\BuildTools\MSBuild\Current\Bin; C:\Program Files (x86)\Microsoft Visual Studio\2019\Enterprise\MSBuild\Current\Bin; C:\Program Files (x86)\Microsoft Visual Studio\2019\Community\MSBuild\Current\Bin
17.0		2022	C:\Program Files\Microsoft Visual Studio\2022\BuildTools\MSBuild\Current\Bin; C:\Program Files\Microsoft Visual Studio\2022\Preview\MSBuild\Current\Bin; C:\Program Files\Microsoft Visual Studio\2022\Professional\MSBuild\Current\Bin; C:\Program Files\Microsoft Visual Studio\2022\Enterprise\MSBuild\Current\Bin; C:\Program Files\Microsoft Visual Studio\2022\Community\MSBuild\Current\Bin
18.0		2026	C:\Program Files\Microsoft Visual Studio\2026\BuildTools\MSBuild\Current\Bin; C:\Program Files\Microsoft Visual Studio\2026\Preview\MSBuild\Current\Bin; C:\Program Files\Microsoft Visual Studio\2026\Professional\MSBuild\Current\Bin; C:\Program Files\Microsoft Visual Studio\2026\Enterprise\MSBuild\Current\Bin; C:\Program Files\Microsoft Visual Studio\2026\Community\MSBuild\Current\Bin

== Terminology ==
Target
A Target contains a set of tasks for MSBuild to execute. The focus of MSBuild is the result Target specified when invoking MSBuild with the project file. This is because a Project may contain several Target entries, each executed sequentially (and conditionally). Subsequent dependent Targets are executed before the requested Target. The execution flow of the current Target can be directed using the following attributes: Condition, BeforeTargets, AfterTargets, & DependsOnTargets. Each Target may be self-contained with the necessary Tasks to complete itself. A Target is typically an action executed on a file, set of files or directory.
Task
A Task is a command which is executed in order to complete a Target. Tasks are used to group and execute any number of actions during the build process. They are typically implemented in a .NET assembly as a class which inherits from the Task class or implements the ITask interface. Many basic tasks are shipped as part of the .NET Framework, and community developed tasks are freely available. Some examples of Tasks include copying files, creating directories, or parsing XML.
Properties and Items
MSBuild provides Properties and Items, which are conceptually equivalent to make's macros. Properties specify static values, whereas Items are usually used to define sets of files or folders on which to perform Tasks. Specifying files on Items is made easy by the support of wildcards.

== See also ==
- List of build automation software
