= Buildbot =

Continuous integration testing framework

- Original author(s): Brian Warner
- Developer(s): Dustin J. Mitchell
- Initial release: April 29, 2003; 22 years ago
- Stable release: 4.3.0 / 12 May 2025; 2 months ago
- Repository: github.com/buildbot/buildbot
- Written in: Python
- Operating system: POSIX, Windows
- Size: 4.6 MB
- Type: Continuous integration
- License: GPLv2
- Website: www.buildbot.net

Buildbot is a software development continuous integration tool which automates the compile or test cycle required to validate changes to the project code base. It began as a light-weight alternative to the Mozilla project's Tinderbox, and is now used by Python, WebKit, LLVM, Blender, ReactOS, and many other projects.

== Implementation ==
Buildbot is written in Python on top of the Twisted libraries.

== SCM support ==
As of March 2021, in version 2.10.1, Buildbot supports SCM integration with CVS, Subversion, Darcs, Mercurial, Bazaar, Git, Monotone, Repo/Gerrit, Perforce, and BitKeeper.

== See also ==
- Build automation
- Comparison of continuous integration software
