= Vexor =

Testing Software

- Developer: Evrone
- Release: October 2014
- Platform: Web
- Type: Continuous integration
- Website: vexor.io (English) vexor.ru (Russian)

Vexor is a distributed cloud web-service for building and testing software, a continuous integration tool.

== Description ==
Vexor helps a developers’ team to keep to Continuous Integration methodology. The original code of the project can be stored at GitHub, Bitbucket or at GitLab. The number of workers launched simultaneously is not limited as they automatically start for each new build.

The following languages are maintained: Ruby, Clojure, Scala, Python, Node.js, Go, Rust, Haskell. It is possible to use a configuration file in the vexor.yml format or an already written file in the Travis CI format (.travis.yml). Vexor can also send notification e-mails and notification messages into a Slack chat. The fee depends on the number of minutes spent on the work of the service. On July 25, 2015, one minute cost $0.015. Starting April 1, 2017 Vexor removed their 100 minutes/month free tier for all accounts. There are no plans to support open source projects with free tiers, currently.

== History ==
Vexor is being developed by the Evrone Company. The service was launched in October 2014.

Among Vexor clients one can find: Meduza, Bookmate, InSales and others.

== See also ==
- Travis CI
- Continuous integration
- Software development
- Software testing
