= T4P =

T4P may refer to:

- Tech for Palestine, an advocacy group coalition
- Type IV pili
- T4P, a system for skeleton programming
- An area code for Red Deer, Alberta, Canada
