= Buildkite =

Continuous integration software

- Trade name: Buildkite Pty. Ltd.
- Formerly: Buildbox
- Industry: CI/CD
- Founded: September 3, 2013; 13 years ago in Melbourne, Australia
- Founder: Keith Pitt

Buildkite is a continuous integration (CI) and continuous delivery (CD) platform used in DevOps. The company was founded in September 2013. Companies using Buildkite include Wayfair, Shopify, Slack, Twilio, Canva, Pinterest, Envato, SafetyCulture, MYOB, Lyft and Uber.

== Company history ==
Buildkite Pty Ltd was founded in September 2013 as Buildbox, with the product out of beta in November. Tim Lucas came on board as a co-founder. The original name of the company, Buildbox, had to be changed due to another company registering the trademark first, reportedly by only two weeks.

In 2022, they announced a new tool, Test Analytics. In 2023, the company makes their first acquisition, PackageCloud, from a private equity firm. PackageCloud allows companies to store and distribute software to clients.

=== Financing ===
In 2020, Buildkite raised $28M AUD, led by OpenView, with General Catalyst. The company was valued at 200M (AUD) in that deal. In November 2022, the company raised a Series B round of $21M ($32M AUD), with investors including One Ventures, Dominic Pym (angel) and AirTree. Total funding investment at the time of writing is $39MUSD.

== Products ==
=== Pipelines ===
Buildkite Pipelines, Buildkite's primary product, was built with a hybrid model where build agents are self-hosted, yet supported by a managed, cloud-powered interface. In the hybrid model, the customer provides their own infrastructure for running agents, including their secrets, while Pipelines has a web application to handle user authentication, build orchestration, store logs and metrics.

Features of Buildkite Pipelines include parallelized builds, self-hosted agent infrastructure, build visualization, and integrations with services like GitHub, Bitbucket, GitLab, and Slack. Pipelines permits up to 10,000 agents per account for customers.

The platform allows the creation of pipelines, which are the definitions (in YAML format) for entire automated build processes. A pipeline consists of individual steps, where each step defines an executable job that runs on one or more agents. Agents are the computers, virtual machines, or containerised infrastructure that provide the capabilities to execute these jobs.

An example of a pipeline YAML file, consisting of three steps:

steps:
  - label: ":hammer: Tests"
    key: "tests"
    command: scripts/tests.sh
    env:
      BUILDKITE_DOCKER_COMPOSE_CONTAINER: app

  - label: ":package: Package"
    depends_on: "tests"
    command: scripts/build-binaries.sh
    artifact_paths: "pkg/*"
    env:
      BUILDKITE_DOCKER_COMPOSE_CONTAINER: app

  - label: ":debian: Publish"
    depends_on: "tests"
    command: scripts/build-debian-packages.sh
    artifact_paths: "deb/**/*"
    branches: "main"
    agents:
      queue: "deploy"

=== Test Analytics ===
Test Analytics requires a test collector with a test suite that runs as a part of the pipelines definition. There is a Test Collector Buildkite plugin for JSON and Junit files, and some frameworks have specific test collectors, e.g. specific JavaScript frameworks.

The test collector gathers data about the test suite's execution to report back to Test Analytics for visualization and interpretation through the web application. Data includes the performance and duration of tests, as well as the reliability (or flakiness) of tests.

=== Packages ===
At the time of writing, Packages is in beta/early access. It's marketed as an artifact and package management solution that "supports all major package formats", splits storage from orchestration for security, includes support of the Buildkite command line interface (CLI), among other features.
