= Go continuous delivery =

Software development tool

GoCD
- Original author: ThoughtWorks
- Release: 2007 (as Cruise)
- Stable release: 25.3.0 / 1 August 2025; 12 months ago
- Preview release: 25.4.0-20900 / 13 August 2025; 12 months ago
- Written in: Java, TypeScript
- Platform: cross platform
- Type: Continuous delivery
- License: Apache License 2.0
- Website: www.gocd.org
- Repository: github.com/gocd/gocd

GoCD is an open-source tool which is used in software development to help teams and organizations automate the continuous delivery (CD) of software. It supports automating the entire build-test-release process from code check-in to deployment. It helps to keep producing valuable software in short cycles and ensure that the software can be reliably released at any time. It supports several version control tools including Git, Mercurial, Subversion, Perforce and TFVC (a la TFS). Other version control software can be supported by installing additional plugins. GoCD is released under the Apache 2 License.

== History ==
GoCD was originally developed at ThoughtWorks Studios in 2007 and was called Cruise before being renamed GoCD in 2010. GoCD was released as open source software in 2014 under the Apache 2 License.

== Plugins ==
GoCD allows for extending its feature by allowing users to install several plugins to allow integration with authentication and authorization software, version control software, build tools, notification and chat tools and cloud computing providers.

== See also ==
- Comparison of continuous integration software
