= OpenMake Software =

DevOps company

- Type: Private
- Industry: Computer software, DevOps
- Founded: 1995
- Founders: Tracy Ragan; Steven Taylor
- Headquarters: Santa Fe, NM, U.S.
- Key people: Steven Taylor, CEO; Tracy Ragan, COO; Phil Gibbs, CTO; Michael Hallett, CRO
- Website: openmakesoftware.com

OpenMake Software formerly Catalyst System is a privately held, DevOps company.

OpenMake Software has offices in North America and Europe.

== History ==
Openmake Software was founded as Catalyst Systems in 1995 by Tracy Ragan and Steven Taylor.

OpenMake Software entered into an OEM agreement with CA Technology in 1997 adding automated build functionality to CA Harvest for software configuration management. This relationship continues today.

In September 2012, OpenMake software acquired the assets of Trinem Consulting of Edinburgh, UK. Following a complete refresh and update to the UI, DeployHub (formerly Release Engineer) was made GA in October 2014.

== Products ==
- Openmake Meister for Build Automation.
- Openmake DeployHub for Multi-Platform Application release automation (ARA).

== Awards ==
- OpenMake Software received the 19th Jolt Award in Change and Configuration Management] and was nominated for the 16th Jolt Award.
- OpenMake Software has been recognized on the SD Times 100 list, or the top innovators and leaders in the software development including DevOps Leadership.
- OpenMake Software was on the SD Times Top 100 list in 2006, 2007, 2008, 2017
- OpenMake Software was also recognized by the Code Project Members Choice Award in 2009 and 2010 for Best In ALM, and 2011 for Best In Agile.
