= NAnt =

Free and open source software tool

- Developer: Gerry Shaw
- Stable release: 0.92 / June 9, 2012; 13 years ago
- Preview release: n/a
- Written in: C#
- Operating system: Cross-platform
- Platform: .NET Framework, Mono
- Type: Build automation
- License: GPL
- Website: nant.sourceforge.net
- Repository: github.com/nant/nant

NAnt is a free and open source software tool for automating software build processes. It is similar to Apache Ant, but targeted at the .NET environment rather than Java. The name NAnt comes from the fact that the tool is Not Ant.

NAnt requires one of the .NET frameworks (1.0, 1.1, 2.0, 3.5 or 4.0) or the third party Mono platform.

== Front-ends ==
There are several front-end GUI tools available:

- NAntBuilder, a full-featured Integrated Development Environment (IDE) for NAnt. It is designed to be a NAnt script creator, editor, and debugger.
- NAntGUI, an open source tool for editing and running NAnt scripts.
- Nantpad, a commercial tool by Profusion Software Studios that allows authoring, browsing and executing NAnt scripts.
- ColorNAnt, The Perl script ColorNAnt is a wrapper for 'NAnt' and produces the same output but with pretty 'syntax' highlighting. Color schemes can be customized.
- NantMenu, a Windows Shell Extension allowing you to run NAnt build scripts directly from within Windows Explorer.

== See also ==
- Build automation
- List of build automation software
- MSBuild
