= Checkstyle =

Java code analysis tool

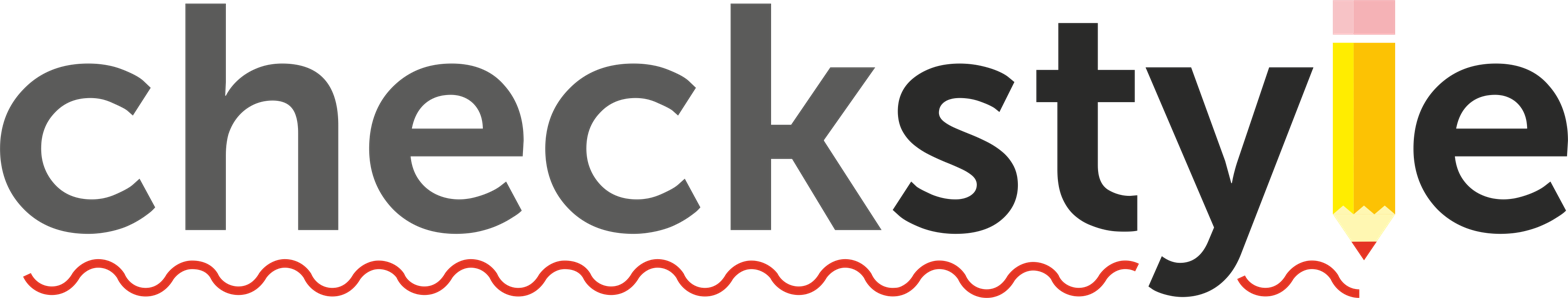
- Stable release: 13.0.0 / January 4, 2026; 11 days ago
- Repository: github.com/checkstyle/checkstyle
- Written in: Java
- Operating system: Cross-platform
- Type: Static code analysis
- License: GNU Lesser General Public License
- Website: checkstyle.sourceforge.net

Checkstyle is a static code analysis tool used in software development for checking if Java source code is compliant with specified coding rules.

Originally developed by Oliver Burn in 2001, the project is maintained by a team of developers from around the world.

The current stable release is version 13.0.0 which supports Java versions from 21.

== Advantages and limits ==
The programming style adopted by a software development project can help to ensure that the code is compliant with good programming practices which improve the quality, readability, and re-usability of the code and may reduce the cost of development. The checks performed by Checkstyle are mainly limited to the presentation of the code. These checks do not confirm the correctness or completeness of the code. Checkstyle rules are not programming style, they are merely rules for formatting the code.

== Examples of available modules ==
Checkstyle defines a set of available modules, each of which provides rules checking with a configurable level of strictness (mandatory, optional...). Each rule can raise notifications, warnings, and errors. For example, Checkstyle can examine the following:

- Javadoc comments for classes, attributes and methods;
- Naming conventions of attributes and methods;
- The number of function parameters;
- Line lengths;
- The presence of mandatory headers;
- The use of imports, and scope modifiers;
- The spaces between some characters;
- The practices of class construction;
- Multiple complexity measurements.

== Usage ==
Checkstyle is available as a JAR file which can run inside a Java VM or as an Apache Ant task. It can also be integrated into an IDE or other tools.

== See also ==
- List of tools for static code analysis
- EclipseCS - Eclipse plugin for checkstyle.
- Checkstyle-IDEA - Checkstyle plugin for IntelliJ IDEA and Android Studio
- SevNTU-Checkstyle - extension for EclipseCS with number of check that are not part of checkstyle upstream.
- Checkstyle Addons - Additional Checkstyle checks
- Checkstyle for PHP - a PHP version of Checkstyle
