= Tech for Palestine =

Pro-Palestinian advocacy campaign

- Abbreviation: T4P
- Formation: 2023
- Key people: Paul Biggar
- Website: techforpalestine.org

Tech for Palestine (T4P) is a coalition of technologists, digital rights organizations, and advocacy groups who engage with issues related to the Israeli–Palestinian conflict through technology. Activities under this effort include internal organizing by employees in technology companies, public campaigns, and support for Palestinian access to digital tools and infrastructure. Tech for Palestine was founded in January 2024 amidst the Gaza war. In 2026, T4P released a 223-page report on how Israel is running multiple campaigns to influence Wikipedia.

== Background ==
Tech for Palestine was founded by a group of over 40 technologists in January 2024. It is run by Paul Biggar, a co-founder of the tech company CircleCI and Darklang. Biggar was dismissed from the board of CircleCl following the blog post where he chastised industry leaders for "actively cheering on genocide".

Since Biggar launched the project, Tech for Palestine has grown from a small community of tech workers organized on the social media platform Discord to a nonprofit that employs five full-time Palestinian engineers and supports over 70 projects. Biggar has compared his Tech for Palestine project to the advocacy for African Americans in the Black Lives Matter movement.

== Activities ==
Tech for Palestine has created web tools such as GitHub badges and site banners related to calls for a ceasefire and maintains a database of Israeli companies and venture capital firms. One of their projects, "Boycottech", is a website that lists Israeli technology companies in the context of boycott campaigns. Companies on Tech for Palestine's boycott list include Fireblocks, Monday, Wiz, and eToro.

The group runs the T4P Incubator which coordinates volunteer involvement and provides organizational support to over 20 tech-related initiatives. The incubator backs UpScrolled, a social media platform launched in 2025, and as of January 29th 2026 the most downloaded social media application in the Apple App Store. T4P acts as an organizational hub, connecting project leaders with volunteers via platforms like Discord and GitHub.

In 2024, Tech for Palestine had a workgroup on editing Wikipedia.
