= Continuous test-driven development =

Software development practice

Continuous test-driven development (CTDD) is a software development practice that extends test-driven development (TDD) by means of automatic test execution in the background, sometimes called continuous testing.

== Practice ==
In CTDD the developer writes a test first but is not forced to execute the tests manually. The tests are run automatically by a continuous testing tool running in the background. This technique can potentially reduce the time waste resulting from manual test execution by eliminating the need for the developer to start the test after each phase of the normal TDD practice: after writing the (initially failing) test, after producing the minimal amount of code for the test to pass and after refactoring the code.

=== Continuous testing tools ===
- Infinitest open source Eclipse and IntelliJ plug-in
- NCrunch commercial continuous testing plug-in for Visual Studio
- Autotest - continuous testing for Ruby
- AutoTest.NET - autotest for .NET
- AutoTest.NET fork for CTDD
- Mighty-Moose - packaged version of AutoTest.NET
- Wallaby.js - continuous testing for JavaScript/TypeScript/CoffeeScript
- PyCrunch — continuous testing for Python, with PyCharm plugin
