= Gradle =

Free software build automation tool

Gradle Build Tool (by Develocity)
- Developers: Hans Dockter, Adam Murdoch, Szczepan Faber, Peter Niederwieser, Luke Daley, Rene Gröschke, Daz DeBoer
- Release: 21 April 2008; 18 years ago
- Stable release: 9.8.2 / 19 October 2026; 11 days ago
- Preview release: 9.9.0 RC1 / 30 October 2026; 0 days ago
- Written in: Java, Groovy, Kotlin
- Type: Build tool
- License: Apache License 2.0
- Website: gradle.org
- Repository: https://github.com/gradle/gradle

Gradle Build Tool ("Gradle") is a build automation tool for multi-language software development produced by Develocity. It manages tasks like compilation, packaging, testing, deployment, and publishing. Supported languages include Java (as well as JDK-based languages Kotlin, Groovy, Scala), C/C++, and JavaScript. Gradle builds on the concepts of Apache Ant and Apache Maven, and introduces a Groovy- and Kotlin-based domain-specific language contrasted with the XML-based project configuration used by Maven. Gradle uses a directed acyclic graph to provide dependency management. The graph is used to determine the order in which tasks should be executed. Gradle runs on the Java Virtual Machine.

Gradle was designed for multi-project builds, which can grow to be large. It operates based on a series of build tasks that can run serially or in parallel. Incremental builds are supported by determining the parts of the build tree that are already up to date; any task dependent only on those parts does not need to be re-executed. It also supports caching of build components, potentially across a shared network using the Gradle Build Cache. Combined with the proprietary hosted service of Develocity, it produces web-based build visualizations called Gradle Build Scans. The software is extensible for new features and programming languages with a plugin subsystem.

Gradle is distributed as Free Software under the Apache License 2.0, and was first released in 2008.

== History ==
=== Origin of the name ===
Founder and CEO of Gradle Technologies (now known as Develocity), Hans Dockter, has said that he originally wanted to name the project "Cradle". However, to make the name unique and less "diminutive" he instead chose "Gradle", taking the "G" from the use of Groovy.

=== Major versions ===
Version	Date
0.1	21 April 2008
1.0	12 June 2012
2.0	1 July 2014
3.0	15 August 2016
4.0	14 June 2017
5.0	26 November 2018
6.0	8 November 2019
7.0	9 April 2021
8.0	13 February 2023
9.0	31 July 2025

== Features ==
Gradle offers support for all phases of a build process including compilation, verification, dependency resolving, test execution, source code generation, packaging and publishing. Because Gradle follows a convention over configuration approach, it is possible to describe all of these build phases in short configuration files. Conventions include the folder structure of the project, standard tasks and their order as well as dependency repositories. However, all conventions can be overridden by the project configuration if necessary.

Plugins are a central component of Gradle. They allow for integration of a set of configurations and tasks into a project and can be included from a central plugin repository or custom-developed for a single project.

== Distribution ==
Gradle is available as a separate download, but can also be found bundled in products such as Android Studio. Gradle Wrapper is the recommended way to invoke Gradle. It can download the declared version of Gradle beforehand if necessary.

== See also ==
- List of build automation software
