= Application-release automation =

Process of packaging and deployment

Application-release automation (ARA) refers to the process of packaging and deploying an application or update of an application from development, across various environments, and ultimately to production. ARA solutions must combine the abilities of deployment automation, environment management and modeling, and release coordination.

== Relationship with DevOps ==
ARA tools can help to cultivate DevOps best practices by providing a combination of automation, environment modeling and workflow-management capabilities. These practices help teams deliver software rapidly, reliably and responsibly. In particular, ARA can assist with continuous delivery.

== Relationship with deployment ==
ARA deploys applications using structured release-automation techniques that can allow for increased visibility of deployed software. It combines workload automation and release-management tools as they relate to release packages, as well as movement through different environments within the DevOps pipeline. ARA tools help regulate deployments, environments, and releases.

== ARA Solutions ==
All ARA solutions must include capabilities in automation, environment modeling, and release coordination. Additionally, the solution must provide this functionality without reliance on other tools.

Solution	Released by
BuildMaster	Inedo
CA Release Automation and Automic	CA Technologies
DeployHub	OpenMake Software
Deployment Automation (formerly Serena Deployment Automation)	Micro Focus
CloudBees Release Automation (formerly Electric Flow)	CloudBees
Hybrid Cloud Management (Ultimate Edition)	Micro Focus
IBM UrbanCode Deploy	IBM
Puppet Enterprise	Puppet
Release Lifecycle Management	BMC Software
Visual Studio Release Management	Microsoft
XL Deploy & XL Release	XebiaLabs
