= Build automation =

Building software via an unattended fashion

Build automation is the practice of building software systems in a relatively unattended fashion. The build is configured to run with minimized or no software developer interaction and without using a developer's personal computer. Build automation encompasses the act of configuring the build system and the resulting system.

Build automation encompasses both sequencing build operations via non-interactive interface tools and running builds on a shared server.

== Tools ==
Build automation tools allow sequencing the tasks of building software via a non-interactive interface. A build system or build automation tool is a programming tool or set of tools that automate the compiling and linking of source code into an executable program or library. They streamline the software development process by managing dependencies, resolving conflicts, and ensuring consistent builds across different environments.

When software projects grow complex, their build steps may involve multiple programming languages or compiling units, making manual build processes increasingly cumbersome. Dependencies between code components necessitate careful ordering and potentially different tools for each piece. Managing these dependencies manually can quickly lead to version conflicts, stale binaries, and difficulty tracking updates, making solutions such as shell scripts too difficult to maintain.

While individual developers might compile code directly, a robust build system is foundational to efficient software development in large organizations and teams, where automated builds become commonplace and most builds are triggered automatically rather than manually. Given the essential role of build systems, it is said that they act as "repositories of essential build knowledge". They effectively eliminate roadblocks and accelerate development velocity by enabling engineers to share resources and results.

=== Incremental build ===
An incremental build is a process within a build system where build tools use an incremental compiler to recompile only the parts of a software project that have changed since the last build, rather than rebuilding everything from scratch. This optimization reduces build time by leveraging dependency tracking, caching, and selective compilation.

Incremental builds are especially valuable in large-scale software projects, where recompiling the entire codebase can be time-consuming and resource-intensive. By identifying and compiling only the modified components—such as source files, libraries, or modules—the build system ensures faster iteration cycles, enabling developers to test and debug changes more efficiently.

The process relies on a dependency graph, which maps relationships between files, modules, or components in the project. When a change is detected, the build system traverses this graph to determine which parts of the project are affected and need to be recompiled. Modern build tools, such as Make, Gradle and Bazel, often incorporate incremental build capabilities to streamline development workflows.

While incremental builds offer significant performance advantages, they also introduce challenges, such as ensuring the accuracy of dependency tracking and avoiding stale or inconsistent build artifacts. To address these issues, some build systems provide mechanisms for "clean builds," which rebuild the entire project from scratch to guarantee correctness when necessary. Because of this issue, incremental builds are rarely used in continuous integration systems, where correctness is preferred to compilation speed.

=== Key features ===
Most build systems include features that make building large projects easier:

- Dependency management: Resolving and tracking dependencies between components.
- Incremental builds: Only rebuilding what has changed.
- Cross-platform support: Building for multiple environments (e.g., Windows, Linux, macOS).
- Parallel builds: Speeding up builds by running tasks concurrently.
- Extensibility: Supporting plugins or custom scripts.

=== Example tools ===
Tools such as Make can be used via custom configuration file or using the command-line. Custom tools such as shell scripts can also be used, although they become increasingly cumbersome as the codebase grows more complex.

Some tools, such as shell scripts, are task-oriented declarative programming. They encode sequences of commands to perform with usually minimal conditional logic.

Some tools, such as Make are product-oriented. They build a product, a.k.a. target, based on configured dependencies.

== Servers ==
A build server is a server setup to run builds. In contrast to a personal computer, a server allows for a more consistent and available build environment.

Traditionally, a build server was a local computer dedicated as a shared resource instead of used as a personal computer. Today, there are many cloud computing, software as a service (SaaS) websites for building.

Without a build server, developers typically rely on their personal computers for building, leading to several drawbacks, such as, but not limited to:

- Developers who know how to build may be unavailable (e.g., on vacation)
- Issues with a developer's machine may prevent building.
- Conflicting software on a developer's machine may hinder proper building

A continuous integration server is a build server that is setup to build in a relatively frequent way, often on each code commit. A build server may also be incorporated into a tool for application release automation (ARA) or application lifecycle management (ALM).

Typical build triggering options include:

- On-demand – requested by a user
- Scheduled – such as a nightly build
- On-commit – building on every commit to a version control system

== Continuous integration and continuous delivery ==
Automating the build process is a required step for implementing continuous integration and continuous delivery (CI/CD), all of which are considered best practices for software development.

== Advantages ==
Pluses of build automation include:

- Can save time and money in the long run
- Enables continuous integration, delivery and testing
- More consistent build process
- Can optimize the build process, reducing time and redundant tasks
- Reduces dependency on key personnel and their personal computers
- Can automate collection of build history

== See also ==
- Application-release automation – Process of packaging and deployment
- Continuous configuration automation
- Continuous integration – Software development practice
- Continuous delivery – Software engineering approach of short cycles
- Continuous testing – Automated testing process in software development
- DevOps – Integration of software development and operations
- Incremental compiler
- List of build automation software
- Product family engineering
- Release engineering – Sub-discipline in software engineering
- Software configuration management – Tracking and controlling software changes
- Unit testing – Validating the behavior of isolated source code
- Vibe coding – AI-assisted coding using natural language
