= List of build automation software =

This page lists notable software build automation tools and systems.

== Sequencing ==
These tools sequence build operations, often based on dependencies, sometimes running tasks in parallel.

- Apache Ant – Java build tool; uses XML format for configuration files
- Apache Maven – Software tool for managing build dependencies
- ASDF
- Bazel – Software tool that automates software builds and tests
- BitBake – Build automation tool often used for building Linux distributions; written in Python
- Boot; written in Clojure
- Boost boost.build – For C++ projects, cross-platform, based on Perforce Jam
- Buck – Build system developed and used by Meta Platforms; written in Rust, using Starlark (BUILD file syntax) as Bazel
- Buildout; Python-based
- Cabal
- Cargo The Rust package manager and Build tool
- D Dub – Official package and build manager of D language
- Flowtracer – Build management tool
- Gradle – Free software build automation tool with a Groovy- and Kotlin-based domain specific language (DSL) combining features of Ant and Maven with more features like a reliable incremental build
- Grunt – JavaScript build tool
- Gulp – Server-side JavaScript build tool
- IncrediBuild – Grid computing software
- Leiningen – Build automation tool; for Clojure projects
- Make – Software build automation tool; one of the earliest build automation tools; many variants
- Mix – Build automation software for Elixir
- MSBuild – Build automation software; from Microsoft
- NAnt; based on Ant
- Ninja – Free build automation software
- Perforce Jam – Build tool by Perforce, inspired by Make
- Qt Build System
- Rake
- sbt – Open-source build tool for Scala and Java projects
- SCons – Software development tool; Python-based
- Stack – Haskell development tool
- Waf; Python-based

== Meta build ==
Called meta-build tools, these generate configuration files for other build tools such as those listed above.

- CMake – Cross-platform build tool for configuring platform-specific builds; very popular and integrated with integrated development environments (IDEs) such as Qt Creator, KDevelop and GNOME Builder
- GNU build system (aka Autotools) – Software build toolset from GNU
- GYP (Generate Your Projects) – Build automation tool created by Google; superseded by GN which generates files for ninja and other tools
- imake
- OpenMake Software Meister
- Meson – Build automation tool; integrated with GNOME Builder
- Premake – Cross-platform build tool for configuring platform-specific builds; written in Lua
- qmake – Software build automation tool

== Continuous integration ==
Continuous integration systems automate build operations at a relatively high level via features including: scheduling and triggering builds, storing build log and output files and integrating with version control systems.

- AnthillPro – Continuous integration server
- Apache Continuum – Continuous integration server for building Java-based projects; discontinued
- Bitbucket Pipelines and Deployments – Continuous integration for Bitbucket hosted repositories
- Buildbot – Continuous integration testing framework
- CruiseControl – Software continuous build framework
- Go continuous delivery – Open source, cross-platform
- GitLab Runner – Continuous integration
- GitHub Actions – Free continuous integration service for open-source projects
- Hudson – Continuous integration tool
- Jenkins – Open source automation server; Hudson fork
- Spinnaker – Open source multi-cloud continuous delivery service from Netflix and Google
- TeamCity – Build management and continuous integration server
- Travis CI – Service to build and test software projects

== Others ==
- BuildStream A flexible, extensible framework written in Python for modeling build and CI pipelines using a declarative YAML format.
- checkinstall – Computer program for Unix-like operating systems
- Open Build Service – Development platform for Linux distributions

== Licensing ==
Tool	License
Ant	Apache 2.0
AnthillPro	Discontinued
Bamboo	Trialware
Bazel	Apache 2.0
Boot	Eclipse Public
Capistrano	MIT
CMake	BSD 3-clause
Collective Knowledge Framework	BSD 3-clause
Continuum	Apache 2.0
CruiseControl	BSD-style license
Dub	MIT
Gradle	Apache 2.0
Jenkins	MIT
Homebrew	BSD 2-clause
Leiningen	Eclipse Public
make	Same as bundling OS
Maven	Apache 2.0
Meson build system	Apache 2.0
MPW Make	Freeware
MSBuild	MIT
NAnt	GNU GPL
nmake	Freeware
Open Build Service	GNU GPL
Perforce Jam	Discontinued
Rake	MIT
sbt (Simple Build Tool)	BSD 3-clause
SCons	MIT
Team Foundation Server	Trialware
Waf	BSD 3-clause

== See also ==
- Comparison of continuous integration software
- List of software package management systems
- List of version-control software
- Make variants – Tools based on or very similar to Unix make
- Software configuration management – Tracking and controlling software changes
