= GYP (software) =

Build automation tool created by Google

- Original author: Mark Mentovai
- Developer: Chromium.org
- Repository: chromium.googlesource.com/external/gyp
- Written in: Python
- Operating system: macOS, Linux, Solaris, FreeBSD, OpenBSD, Windows
- Type: Build automation programming
- License: BSD license
- Website: gyp.gsrc.io

GYP (generate your projects) is an obsolete build automation tool created in 2011 by Google.

== Tool ==
Its purpose was to generate native integrated development environment (IDE) project files (such as Visual Studio and Xcode) for building the Chromium web browser and is licensed as open source software using the BSD software license.

The functionality of GYP is similar to the CMake build tool. GYP processes a file that contains a JSON dictionary in order to generate one or more target project make files. The single source .GYP file is generic while the target files are specific to each targeted build tool.

In 2016, the Chromium project replaced GYP with GN, a tool that generates ninja builds. The switch to GN resulted in a 20x speedup for their use case. Other projects that migrated from GYP to GN include the V8 Javascript engine, WebRTC and Dart.

Software projects that are still built using GYP include Node.js and Telegram.

== See also ==
- GNU Build System – Software build toolset from GNU
- List of build automation software § Build script generation
- Meson – Build automation tool
- Premake – Cross-platform build tool for configuring platform-specific builds
- SCons – Software development tool
- Waf
