= Spinnaker (disambiguation) =

A spinnaker is a type of sail.

Spinnaker can also refer to:

- Spinnaker (software), an open-source continuous delivery platform
- The Spinnaker (building), in Durban, South Africa
- The Spinnaker, the official student newspaper of the University of North Florida
- Spinnaker Tower, a building in Portsmouth, United Kingdom
- Spinnaker Software, a former software company
- SpiNNaker (Spiking Neural Network architecture), a computer designed to simulate the human brain
- Spinnaker, the callsign for Scandinavian Airlines Ireland

== See also ==
- Spinnaker Island (disambiguation)
