= Acquisition of Sun Microsystems by Oracle Corporation =

Agreement announced in 2009 and completed in 2010

- Initiator: Oracle Corporation
- Target: Sun Microsystems
- Type: Full acquisition
- Cost: $7.4 billion (value) $5.4 billion (net cash / debt)
- Initiated: April 20, 2009
- Completed: January 27, 2010

The acquisition of Sun Microsystems by Oracle Corporation was completed on January 27, 2010. After the acquisition was completed, Oracle, only a software vendor prior to the merger, owned Sun's hardware product lines, such as SPARC Enterprise, as well as Sun's software product lines, including the Java programming language.

Concerns about Sun's position as a competitor to Oracle were raised by antitrust regulators, open source advocates, customers, and employees over the acquisition. The European Commission delayed the acquisition for several months over questions about Oracle's plans for MySQL, Sun's competitor to Oracle Database. The DG COMP of the European Commission finally approved the takeover, apparently pressured by the U.S. DOJ Antitrust Division to do so, according to a diplomatic cable leaked in September 2011.

== History ==
In 2006, it was disclosed that Sun and Apple have discussed a merger on multiple occasions.

In late 2008, Sun was approached by IBM to discuss a possible merger. At about the same time, Sun also began discussions with another company, widely rumored but not confirmed to be Hewlett-Packard, about a potential acquisition. By March 2009, talks had stalled between Sun and both IBM and the other potential suitor.

On April 20, 2009, Sun and Oracle announced that they had entered into a definitive agreement under which Oracle would acquire Sun for $9.50 a share in cash. Net of Sun's cash and debt, this amounted to a $5.6 billion offer from Oracle. Sun's shareholders voted to approve the proposal on July 16, 2009, although the deal was still subject to regulatory approvals. The terms of the agreement between Oracle and Sun included dependencies on the antitrust laws of "the United States and Canada, European Union, China, Israel, Switzerland, Russia, Australia, Turkey, Korea, Japan, Mexico and South Africa".

On August 20, 2009, the U.S. government, pursuant to the Clayton Antitrust Act, approved Oracle's purchase of Sun.

On September 3, 2009, the European Commission announced that it would not immediately approve the deal, but would instead perform a second round of investigation, focusing on the implications of Oracle's control of MySQL (acquired by Sun in 2008).

On October 20, 2009, Sun filed with the U.S. Securities and Exchange Commission (SEC) its intention to cut 3,000 jobs globally over next 12 months, citing losses caused by delays in the acquisition process.

On November 6, in its 10-Q filing for the 1st quarter of the 2010 fiscal year, Sun announced a 25% total revenue decrease compared to the 1st quarter of the previous year, due to "economic downturn, the uncertainty associated with our proposed acquisition by Oracle, increased competition and delays in customer purchasing decisions".

On January 21, 2010, EU Competition Commissioner Neelie Kroes announced unconditional approval of the deal.

On January 27, 2010, Oracle announced that it had completed the acquisition.

== Aftermath ==
=== Resignations ===
Co-branded logo of Sun Microsystems, used for several years after their acquisition by Oracle Corporation

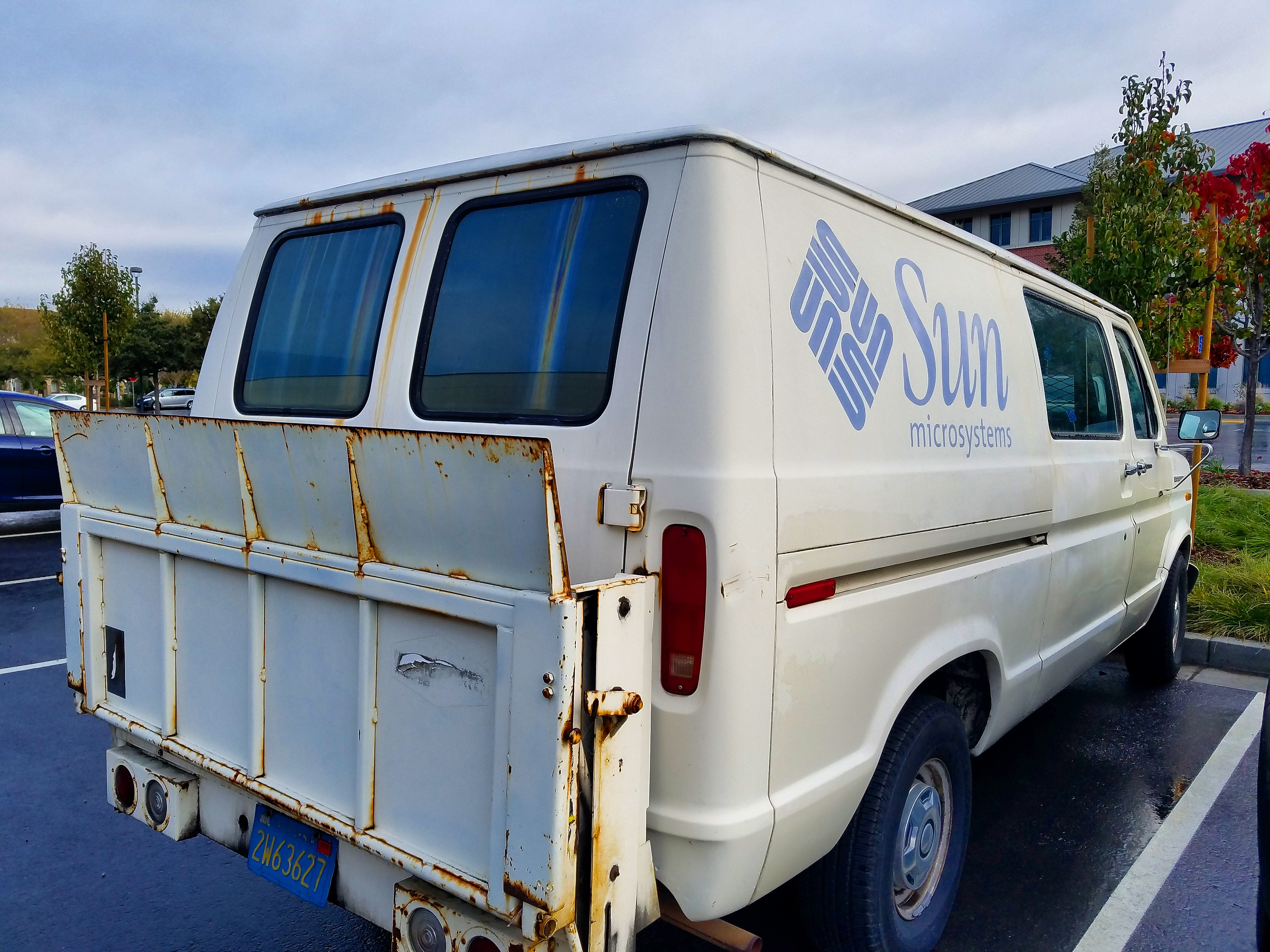
A rusting Sun Microsystems van as seen at the Oracle-acquired Santa Clara, California campus in 2016

Several notable engineers resigned following the acquisition, including James Gosling, the creator of Java (resigned April 2010); Tim Bray, the creator of XML (resigned February 2010); Kohsuke Kawaguchi, lead developer of Hudson (resigned April 2010); and Bryan Cantrill, the co-creator of DTrace (resigned July 2010).

While the deal was still pending regulatory approval, the JRuby team collectively resigned from Sun and moved to Engine Yard.

In early 2010, the Drizzle DBMS team collectively resigned from Sun and moved to Rackspace.

Most of Sun's executive management team, including CEO Jonathan Schwartz, resigned immediately after the acquisition was complete. John Fowler, Executive VP of Sun's systems group, remained at Oracle as Executive Vice President of Hardware Engineering.

Simon Phipps, Sun's Chief Open Source Officer, left the company in March 2010.

=== OpenSolaris and Solaris ===
In early 2010, troubling signals began to emerge concerning the future of OpenSolaris, including its absence from Oracle product roadmaps.

In August 2010, a leaked internal memo indicated that Oracle would no longer release OpenSolaris distributions, including the long-delayed pending release, OpenSolaris 2010.05. The same memo announced that Oracle would no longer release Solaris source code as it was developed, instead only publishing it after the release of each Solaris version. Since Oracle was no longer supporting all the development of an open version of Solaris, the OpenSolaris Governing Board disbanded shortly after this was revealed, ending the project. Independent development continues with the Illumos fork.

On September 2, 2017, Phipps reported that Oracle had laid off virtually all of its Solaris core development staff, interpreting it as a sign that Oracle no longer intends to support future development of the platform.

Oracle Solaris continues with free download and optional licence for support and updates.

=== MySQL petition and forks ===
A major issue discussed in media and considered by the EU Commission was Oracle's acquisition of MySQL, an open-source competitor to Oracle acquired by Sun in February 2008, as part of the deal.

In response, several forks were made with the intent to ensure the future success of MySQL despite being purchased by its biggest competitor. These include Drizzle (discontinued) and MariaDB (actively developed). Monty Widenius, one of the founders of MySQL, also started a petition asking that MySQL either be divested to a third party, or have its licensing changed to be less restrictive than the previous GPL terms it operated under prior to and during its ownership by Sun.

=== Java Android lawsuit ===
Oracle filed a patent infringement lawsuit against Google over its use of Java in the Android platform. Android apps run in the Dalvik Java virtual machine. The apps are written in Java but are compiled into Dalvik's custom bytecode format which is incompatible with standard Java runtime environments. Google thus avoided licensing fees associated with J2ME, the mobile version of Java. However, aspects of the Dalvik system are very similar to the Java technology patented by Sun and now Oracle.

The court found that Oracle's primary copyright claim, based on the Java Application Programming Interface (API), failed because the portions Google reused were not copyrightable. Google was found liable for a small amount of literal code copying. Oracle was limited to statutory damages for these claims. The jury found that Google did not infringe Oracle's patents. Oracle appealed to the Federal Circuit, and Google filed a cross-appeal on the literal copying claim. The hearing was held on December 4, 2013, and the judgement was released on May 9, 2014. The circuit court reversed the district court on the central issue, holding that the "structure, sequence and organization" of an API was copyrightable. It also ruled for Oracle regarding the small amount of literal copying, holding that it was not de minimis. The case was remanded back to the district court for reconsideration of the fair use defense.

A jury determined in 2016 that Google's use of Oracle's APIs was legal under the copyright law's fair use doctrine. Oracle appealed the decision. On March 27, 2018, an appeals court ruled Google violated copyright laws when it used Oracle's open-source Java software to build the Android platform in 2009. "There is nothing fair about taking a copyrighted work verbatim and using it for the same purpose and function as the original in a competing platform," a panel of three Federal Circuit judges concluded.

The Supreme Court issued its decision on April 5, 2021. In a 6–2 majority, the Court ruled that Google's use of the Java APIs was within the bounds of fair use, reversing the Federal Circuit Appeals Court ruling and remanding the case for further hearing.

=== Apache Software Foundation resignations ===
The Apache Software Foundation resigned its seat on the Java SE/EE Executive Committee due to Oracle's refusal to provide a technology compatibility kit (TCK) to the ASF for its Apache Harmony open-source implementation of Java.

=== OpenOffice resignations and forks ===
After it became apparent Oracle was shutting down OpenSolaris, some members of the open source OpenOffice.org Project, concerned about its future with Oracle, formed The Document Foundation and created the LibreOffice fork. The LibreOffice brand was hoped to be provisional, as Oracle had been invited to join The Document Foundation and donate the OpenOffice.org brand.

In response, Oracle demanded that all members of the OpenOffice.org Community Council involved with The Document Foundation step down from the council, citing a conflict of interest. Many community members decided to leave for LibreOffice, which already had the support of Red Hat, Novell, Google, and Canonical. LibreOffice produced its first release in January 2011.

In June 2011 Oracle contributed the OpenOffice.org trademarks and source code to the Apache Software Foundation, which Apache re-licensed under the Apache License. IBM donated the Lotus Symphony codebase to the Apache Software Foundation in 2012. The developer pool for the Apache project was seeded by IBM employees, and Symphony codebase was included in Apache OpenOffice.

=== Hudson/Jenkins fork ===
During November 2010, an issue arose in the Hudson community with respect to the infrastructure used. This grew to encompass questions over the stewardship and control by Oracle. Negotiations between the principal project contributors and Oracle took place. There were many areas of agreement, but a key sticking point was the trademarked name "Hudson", after Oracle claimed the right to the name and applied for a trademark in December 2010. As a result, on January 11, 2011, a call for votes was made to change the project name from "Hudson" to "Jenkins". The proposal was overwhelmingly approved by community vote on January 29, 2011, creating the Jenkins project. On February 1, 2011, Oracle said that they intended to continue development of Hudson, and considered Jenkins a fork rather than a rename. Jenkins and Hudson therefore continue as two independent projects, each claiming the other is the fork.

=== Grid Engine ===
Oracle Grid Engine (previously Sun Grid Engine) was changed to a close-source commercial-only product.

=== Program closures ===
Project Kenai, a SourceForge-like project for Java apps, was migrated to Java.net by Oracle.

Project Darkstar, a project to investigate and create solutions for issues in massive online gaming environments, was closed by Oracle on February 2, 2010.

=== Customer relations ===
Oracle has changed the software support model to also require hardware support. The new policy states "when acquiring technical support, all hardware systems must be supported (e.g., Oracle Premier Support for Systems or Oracle Premier Support for Operating Systems) or unsupported."

In March 2010 the Solaris 10 download license changed to limit unpaid use to 90 days.

=== Virtualization ===
In 2013, Oracle stopped development of several former Sun virtualization solutions, including Virtual Desktop Infrastructure (VDI), Sun Ray, and Oracle Virtual Desktop Client. Two other virtualization technologies acquired from Sun, Oracle Secure Global Desktop and VirtualBox, remained as products.

== See also ==
- Acquisition of the IBM PC business by Lenovo
