= Emdoor =

Chinese computer company

Shenzhen Emdoor Information Co., Ltd.
- Native name: 深圳市亿道信息股份有限公司
- Industry: Rugged computers
- Founded: 2008
- Area served: Worldwide
- Key people: Zane Zhang (founder ＆ chairman)
- Products: Rugged handheld terminals, tablets, laptops
- Parent: Emdoor Group
- Website: www.emdoorrugged.com

Emdoor
- Simplified Chinese: 亿道
- Traditional Chinese: 億道
- Hanyu Pinyin: Yìdào

Emdoor (Chinese: 亿道), with the full name Shenzhen Emdoor Information Co., Ltd., also known as Emdoor Information, is a Chinese provider of rugged mobile computers founded by Zane Zhang in 2008, headquartered in Shenzhen. It is a subsidiary of Emdoor Group, and principally provides rugged tablets, laptops and handheld terminals.

Emdoor is currently a technology ecosystem partner of Microsoft and a partner of Rockchip, as well as a former partner of Electric Cloud.

== History ==
In 2012, Emdoor stepped into the field of rugged tablets, with product lines including rugged phones, tablets and 2-in-1s. Since early 2014, it has collaborated with Intel and become one of the latter's ODM partners in China.

In June 2014, Emdoor joined with Microsoft and Intel to release the EM-I8080, a Windows 8.1 tablet priced at $100. In October, it presented another Windows 8.1 tablet costing around $65 in Hong Kong.

Emdoor cooperated with Microsoft and Intel to unveil a tablet called "EM-i8080" at Computex 2014, which cost just $100.

In 2015, Emdoor worked with Qualcomm and Microsoft to launch Windows 10 Phones in China. In 2020, it rolled out its first 5G rugged tablet.

In April 2016, it was listed on the New Third Board with the stock code NEEQ: 837171, and was delisted on 27 April 2018. The company started IPO counseling, and made a counseling filing with the Shenzhen Securities Regulatory Bureau on December 11, 2020.
