= Leiningen =

Leiningen may refer to:

- Leiningen, Germany
- Principality of Leiningen (former country; 1803-1806)
- House of Leiningen
- Leiningen, the protagonist of the 1938 short story, "Leiningen Versus the Ants" by Carl Stephenson
- Leiningen (software), a build automation tool for the Clojure programming language
