= CloudBees =

Software company in California, US

CloudBees, Inc.
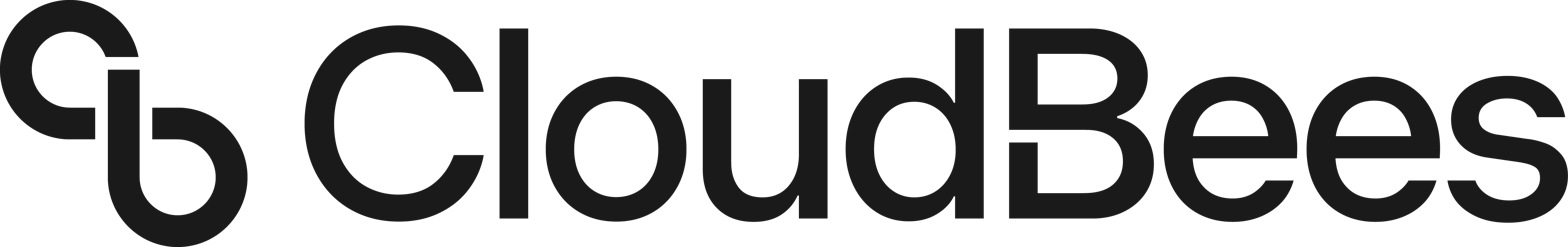
- Type: Private
- Industry: Software development
- Founded: 2010
- Headquarters: San Jose, California
- Key people: Moritz Plassnig (CEO)
- Products: CloudBees Jenkins Platform - Enterprise Edition
- Revenue: $150 million
- Number of employees: 500 (approx.)
- Website: www.cloudbees.com

CloudBees is an enterprise software delivery company. Sacha Labourey and Francois Dechery co-founded the company in early 2010, and investors include Matrix Partners, Lightspeed Venture Partners, HSBC, Verizon Ventures, Golub Capital, Goldman Sachs, Morgan Stanley, and Bridgepoint Group.

CloudBees is headquartered in San Jose, California with additional offices in Raleigh, North Carolina, Lewes, Delaware, Richmond, Virginia, Berlin, London, and Neuchâtel, Switzerland. CloudBees' software originally included a Platform as a Service offering, which let developers use Jenkins (software) in the cloud, along with an on-premise version of Jenkins with additional functions for enterprise companies. In 2020, CloudBees also introduced a Software Delivery Automation platform.

== History ==
CloudBees was founded in 2010 by Sacha Labourey and Francois Dechery. Later that year, CloudBees acquired InfraDNA, a company run by Kohsuke Kawaguchi, the creator of Jenkins.

Since 2010, CloudBees has raised a total of over $250 million in venture financing from investors. CloudBees customers include Salesforce, Capital One, United States Air Force, and HSBC.

In September 2014, CloudBees stopped offering runtime PaaS services and began to focus on its enterprise Jenkins for on-premises and cloud-based continuous delivery. Also in 2014, Kohsuke Kawaguchi, the lead developer and founder of Jenkins, became CloudBees' CTO.

In 2016, the company added a Software as a Service (SaaS) version of its continuous delivery software.

In February 2018, CloudBees acquired the cloud-based continuous delivery company Codeship.

In 2019, CloudBees acquired Electric Cloud and Rollout.

In 2020, Kawaguchi left his role as CTO of CloudBees to found a new company, Launchable.

In 2021, CloudBees announced CloudBees Compliance, a compliance and risk analysis capability platform for software delivery. CloudBees raised $150 million in a series F funding round in December 2021.

In 2022, CloudBees announced the acquisition of ReleaseIQ, a SaaS-based offering, to expand the company’s DevSecOps capabilities. In 2014, CloudBees Inc. acquired the AI-based software testing startup Launchable Inc. In 2025, CloudBees Unify was announced in an early access phase. The devops platform uses an AI features and acts as an operating layer on top of an existing tool chain.
