= SBSE =

SBSE may refer to:

- Search-based software engineering
- Stir bar sorptive extraction
