= Waf (build system) =

- Developer: Thomas Nagy
- Stable release: 2.1.9 / November 13, 2025; 12 months ago
- Written in: Python
- Operating system: MS Windows, POSIX
- Type: Software development tools
- License: New BSD License (source code), CC-BY-NC-ND (documentation)
- Website: waf.io
- Repository: gitlab.com/ita1024/waf/

Waf is a build automation tool designed to assist in the automatic compilation and installation of computer software. It is written in Python and maintained by Thomas Nagy.

Waf's source code is open source software, released under the terms of the New BSD License, though its accompanying documentation is under the CC-BY-NC-ND license, which forbids both modification and commercial redistribution: this prevents vendors such as the Debian project from including Waf documentation in their distributions.

== History ==
Thomas Nagy created a build automation tool called BKsys which was designed to sit on top of SCons, providing higher-level functionality similar to that of Autotools. This was part of an effort for switching KDE away from Autotools to a more modern build system in the beginning stages of the KDE 4 development cycle. BKsys/SCons was chosen by the KDE community as their new standard build system. When Nagy decided that SCons's fundamental issues (most notably the poor scalability) were too complex and time-consuming to fix, he started a complete rewrite which he named Waf. With BKsys being recognized as a dead end, KDE decided to switch to CMake instead; however, Waf continued to be maintained as an individual project.

== Features ==
Waf features:

- Portable to Unix and non-Unix systems
- Lightweight
- Offers a Turing-complete programming language (similar to SCons)
- Support for standard targets: configure, build, clean, distclean, install, and uninstall
- Parallel builds
- Colored output and progress bar display
- Scripts are Python modules
- XML script front-end and a dedicated, easy-to-parse "IDE output" mode to ease the interaction with integrated development environments
- Modular configuration scheme with customizable command-line parsing
- Daemon mode for background recompilation
- Find source files intelligently (glob()-like) to ease script maintenance
- Support for global object cache to avoid unnecessary recompilations
- Support for unit tests run on programs at the end of builds

Waf supports:

- A C/C++ preprocessor for computing dependencies
- Fortran is supported with automated detection of Module dependencies
- Support for OCaml and hybrid programs, and for GNOME programs
- Support for the D programming language (both gdc and dmd are supported)
- Support for C#, Java, Python project
- Provides various tools for processing DocBook, man pages, intltool/msgfmt

Waf is written in Python. Rather than being intended to be installed as a prerequisite piece of system software, as with build systems such as GNU make, it is distributed as a script including an embedded archive file, intended to be run to unpack the Waf sources within a project's own source tree.

== License ==
Waf's source code is released under the terms of the New BSD License. However, Nagy's intent is that Waf is to be included as part of an individual software project rather than installed as a system-wide build system. To that effect, the documentation which is shipped as part of the Waf release is under the CC-BY-NC-ND license, which forbids both modification and commercial redistribution: this change was made in order to obstruct the Debian project from including Waf as a system-wide software package. While Debian initially simply refrained from including documentation, a direct request from Nagy made Debian remove Waf and discourage its use as a build system.

Debian developer Ian Jackson opined that using Waf as distributed in a build system for software under the terms of the GNU General Public License (GNU GPL) would be in breach of the terms of that license, as the unpacking script produces an obfuscated copy of its original source code rather than the "preferred form for modification", as is required by the GPL's wording on build systems.

== See also ==
- List of build automation software
- SCons
- Buildbot
- Buildout
