= Electric Cloud =

American software company

Electric Inc.
- Type: Private
- Industry: Computer Software
- Founded: April 29, 2002
- Defunct: April 2019
- Fate: Acquired by CloudBees and products merged into their portfolio
- Headquarters: San Jose, California, USA
- Key people: Carmine Napolitano; (Chief Executive Officer); John Ousterhout; (Founder); John Graham-Cumming; (Founder)
- Products: ElectricAccelerator; ElectricFlow
- Number of employees: 100
- Website: electric-cloud.com

Electric Cloud, Inc. was a privately held, DevOps software company based in San Jose, California, United States. Founded in 2002, Electric Cloud was a provider of application release orchestration (ARO) tools, automating release pipelines and managing application life cycles. Electric Cloud's products included ElectricFlow and ElectricAccelerator.

In April 2019, CloudBees acquired Electric Cloud and integrated Electric Cloud products into its own portfolio.

== History ==
Electric Cloud was founded on April 29, 2002, by John Ousterhout, the creator of Tcl, and John Graham-Cumming. In November 2002, Electric Cloud released its first product, ElectricAccelerator. In November 2006, ElectricCommander was released. In June 2014, ElectricCommander became the foundation for the orchestration platform called ElectricFlow.

In October 2014, Electric Cloud partnered with author and DevOps specialist Gene Kim to co-found the DevOps Enterprise Summit. The conference focused on agile, continuous delivery, and DevOps transformations within enterprise companies.

In October 2017, Carmine Napolitano, formerly Electric Cloud's CFO, was appointed CEO.

In 2018, Electric Cloud received the highest scores for three out of three use cases as defined in Gartner's 2018 Critical Capabilities for Application Release Orchestration.

Prior to its acquisition, Electric Cloud raised $64.6 million from US Venture Partners, Siemens Venture Capital, Mayfield Fund, RRE Ventures, Rembrandt Venture Partners, and other investors.

=== Acquisition by CloudBees ===
In April 2019, CloudBees acquired Electric Cloud. Terms of the deal were not disclosed.

== See also ==
- Application release automation
- ccache
- distcc
- IncrediBuild
- List of build automation software
- Multi-stage continuous integration
- XebiaLabs
