= Mark Harman (computer scientist) =

British computer scientist

- Citizenship: United Kingdom
- Education: Imperial College London
- Known for: Search Based Software Engineering, software testing
- Awards: IEEE Harlan D. Mills Award (2019); ACM SIGSOFT Outstanding Research Award (2019)
- Scientific career
- Fields: Computer science
- Workplaces: Polytechnic of North London, University of North London, Goldsmiths College (University of London), Brunel University, King's College London, University College London, Facebook

Prof. Mark Harman is a British computer scientist. Since 2010, he has been a professor at University College London (UCL) and since 2017 he has been at Facebook London. He was founder of the Centre for Research on Evolution Search and Testing (CREST) initially at King's College London in 2006, latterly at UCL, and was the Director until 2017. Harman has received both of the major research awards for software engineering (both awarded in 2019): the IEEE Harlan D. Mills Award, for "fundamental contributions throughout software engineering, including seminal contributions in establishing search-based software engineering, reigniting research in slicing and testing, and founding genetic improvement"; and the ACM SIGSOFT Outstanding Research Award He was elected a Fellow of the Royal Academy of Engineering in 2020.

Harman studied software engineering at Imperial College, London, between 1984 and 1988. He has previously worked at the Polytechnic of North London (1988–91), University of North London (1991–97), where he was latterly Head of Computing, Goldsmiths College, University of London (1998–2000), Brunel University (2000–04), and King's College London, UK (2004–10) where he led the Software Engineering Group.

In September 2016, Harman co-founded Majicke Limited, creator of the Sapienz bug finding app. The company was acquired by Facebook and in February 2017 Harman joined Facebook London as a full-time Engineering Manager. He remains as a part-time professor of Software Engineering in CREST and the Computer Science department at University College London. He organizes the annual Facebook Testing & Verification (TAV) Symposium.

Mark Harman has published many academic papers, especially in the area of software testing, with an h-index of 75 (in 2017) according to Google Scholar. He has contributed particularly in the areas of program slicing and program transformation. He is on the editorial boards of a number of academic journals including IEEE Transactions on Software Engineering and Software Testing, Verification & Reliability. He coined the term search-based software engineering (SBSE) with B. F. Jones in 2001. Search-based automated test design technology has been deployed at Facebook since September 2017. Harman has also been working on "web-enabled simulation", a technology which uses a parallel version of Facebook to enable modelling and experimenting with approaches impeding bad actors.

== Books ==
- Harman, M. and Jones, R., First Course in C++: A Gentle Introduction. McGraw-Hill, 1996. ISBN 0-07-709194-9.
- Hierons, R., Bowen, J.P., and Harman, M., editors, Formal Methods and Testing. Springer-Verlag, LNCS, Volume 4949, 2008. ISBN 978-3-540-78916-1.
