= Durban Cruise Terminal =

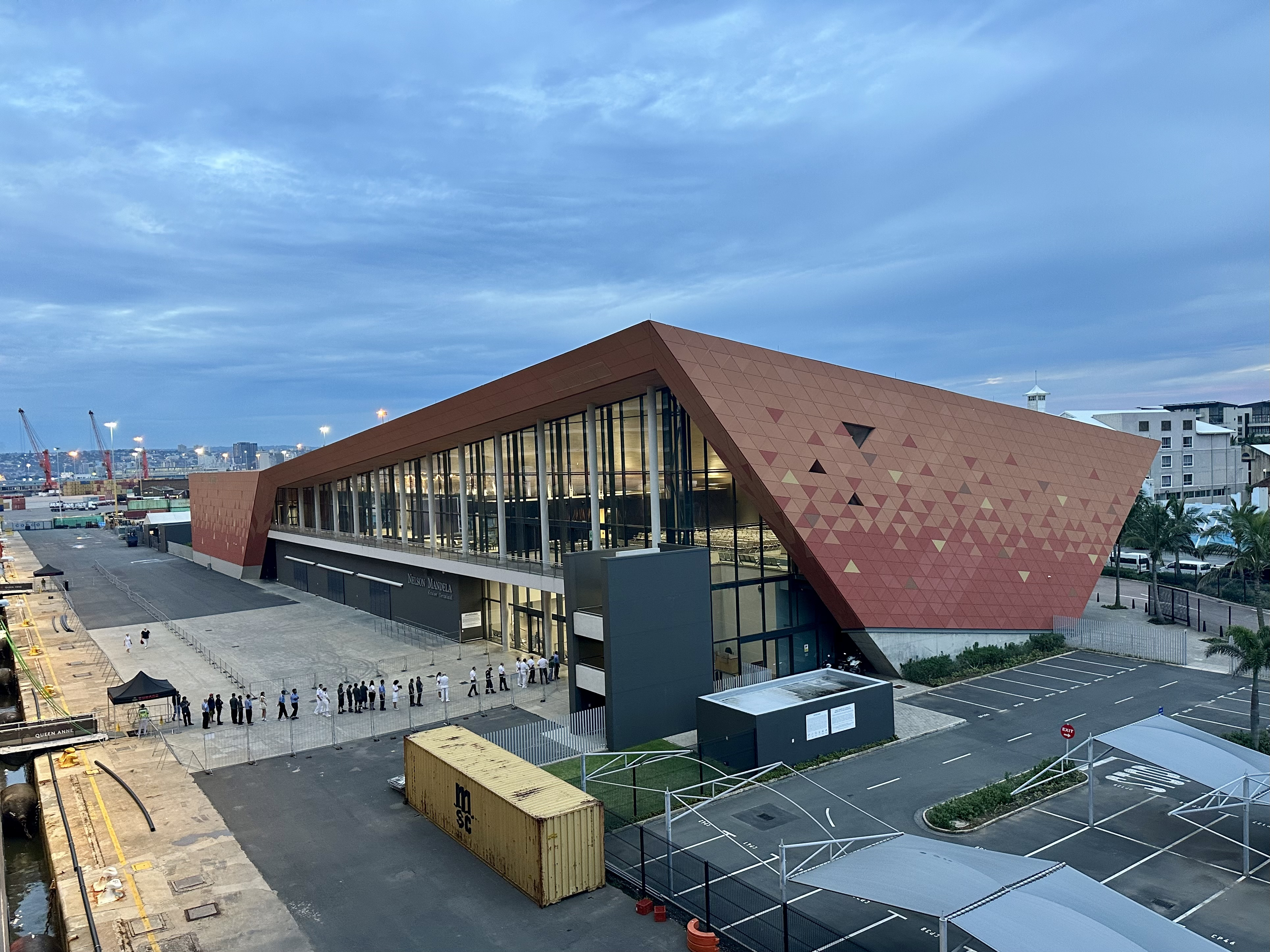

- Location within South Africa
- Former names: N-Shed Passenger Terminal

General information
- Location: Point Waterfront, Durban, South Africa
- Coordinates: 29°52′23″S 31°02′51″E
- Construction started: May 2018
- Completed: November 2021
- Inaugurated: December 2021
- Cost: US$15 Million+ (R200 Million+)
- Owner: KwaZulu Cruise Terminals

Technical details
- Structural system: Cruise Terminal

Design and construction
- Main contractor: KwaZulu Cruise Terminals

The Durban Cruise Terminal is a new cruise ship terminal at the Port of Durban, constructed in the South African city of Durban.

Work on the terminal began in November 2019. The terminal was expected to be completed in 2020, however, due to the COVID-19 restrictions in South Africa, was only completed in 2021. MSC Orchestra was the first cruise ship to sail from the new terminal.

== Business structure ==
After two unsuccessful bids, KwaZulu Cruise Terminals (KCT) – a joint venture between MSC Cruises SA and Africa Armada Consortium – won the bid in May 2017.

The winning bidders have a 25-year concession on the site.

MSC Opera (Lirica Class) will homeport in Cape Town and MSC Musica (Musica Class) in Durban. This will mark the first time that two different classes of MSC Cruises’ ships will be deployed in South Africa simultaneously.

== The construction project ==
The project will cost an estimated R200 million and the building will measure 4,500sqm.

The terminal will include:

- A customs office
- Parking spaces for 200 vehicles including up to 12 buses
- A retail area
- Multipurpose training, conferencing and events facilities
- Separate screening and temporary holding areas
- A Police Station
- Various government offices

== During the COVID-19 pandemic ==
In February 2021, due to lockdown rules imposed during the Coronavirus pandemic, MSC cancelled its South African sailing season. Passengers with tickets booked were offered vouchers for the next sailing season. The ships were scheduled to set sail again in November 2021 at the earliest.
