= Madagascar (software) =

- Release: June 12, 2006
- Stable release: 4.2 / September 9, 2025; 13 months ago
- Preview release: Through Github
- Written in: C, C++, Python
- Operating system: Posix
- Type: Geophysical software
- License: GNU General Public License
- Website: ahay.org
- Repository: github.com/ahay/src

Madagascar is a software package for multidimensional data analysis and reproducible computational experiments.

Technology developed using the Madagascar project management system is transferred in the form of recorded processing histories, which become "computational recipes" to be verified, exchanged, and modified by users of the system.

== Features ==
The Madagascar environment consists of:

1. Standalone programs for out-of-core data analysis;
2. Standalone programs for geophysical data processing and imaging;
3. A development kit for C, C++, Java, Fortran-77, Fortran-90, Python, Matlab, and Octave;
4. A framework for reproducible numerical experiments, based on SCons;
5. A framework for scientific publications, based on SCons and LaTeX;
6. A collection of reproducible scientific articles also used as usage examples and regression tests for the standalone programs;
7. A collection of datasets used as input to reproducible numerical experiments.

== Example script ==
An example SConstruct file is shown below

from rsf.proj import *

Fetch("wz.35.H", "wz")

Flow("wind", "wz.35.H", "dd form=native | window n1=400 j1=2 | smooth rect1=3")
Plot("wind", "pow pow1=2 | grey")

Flow("mute", "wind", "mutter v0=0.31 half=n")
Plot("mute", "pow pow1=2 | grey")

Result("denmark", "wind mute", "SideBySideAniso")

End()

Note that SConstruct by itself does not do any job other than setting rules for building different targets. The targets get built when one executes scons on the command line. Running scons produces

bash$ scons
scons: Reading SConscript files ...
scons: done reading SConscript files.
scons: Building targets ...
retrieve(["wz.35.H"], [])
< wz.35.H /RSF/bin/sfdd form=native | /RSF/bin/sfwindow n1=400 j1=2 | /RSF/bin/sfsmooth rect1=3 > wind.rsf
< wind.rsf /RSF/bin/sfpow pow1=2 | /RSF/bin/sfgrey > wind.vpl
< wind.rsf /RSF/bin/sfmutter v0=0.31 half=n > mute.rsf
< mute.rsf /RSF/bin/sfpow pow1=2 | /RSF/bin/sfgrey > mute.vpl
/RSF/bin/vppen yscale=2 vpstyle=n gridnum=2,1 wind.vpl mute.vpl > Fig/denmark.vpl
scons: done building targets.

== License ==
Madagascar is free software and is licensed under the GPL.

== History ==
Madagascar was first publicly presented at the EAGE Workshop in Vienna in June 2006. The work on the package (previously named RSF) was started by Sergey Fomel in 2003. Since then, many people have contributed to it.

While being written mostly from scratch, Madagascar borrows ideas from the design of SEPlib, an open-source package maintained by Bob Clapp at the Stanford Exploration Project (SEP). Generations of SEP students and researchers contributed to SEPlib. Most important contributions came from Rob Clayton, Jon Claerbout, Dave Hale, Stew Levin, Rick Ottolini, Joe Dellinger, Steve Cole, Dave Nichols, Martin Karrenbach, Biondo Biondi, and Bob Clapp.

Madagascar also borrows ideas from Seismic Unix (SU), a package maintained by John Stockwell at the Center for Wave Phenomenon (CWP) at the Colorado School of Mines (Stockwell, 1997; Stockwell, 1999). Main contributors to SU included Einar Kjartansson, Shuki Ronen, Jack Cohen, Chris Liner, Dave Hale, and John Stockwell. SU adopted an open-source BSD-style license starting with release 40 (April 10, 2007).

== See also ==
- Reproducibility
