= Genetic improvement (computer science) =

In computer software development, genetic improvement is the use of optimisation and machine learning techniques, particularly search-based software engineering techniques such as genetic programming to improve existing software. The improved program need not behave identically to the original. For example, automatic bug fixing improves executable code by reducing or eliminating buggy behaviour. In other cases the improved software should behave identically to the old version but is better because, for example: it runs faster, it uses less memory, it uses less energy or it runs on a different type of computer. GI differs from, for example, formal program translation, in that it primarily verifies the behaviour of the new mutant version by running both the new and the old software on test inputs and comparing their output and performance in order to see if the new software can still do what is wanted of the original program and is now better.

Genetic improvement can be used to create multiple versions of programs, each tailored to be better for a particular use or for a particular computer.

Genetic improvement can be used with multi-objective optimization to consider improving software along multiple dimensions or to consider trade-offs between several objectives, such as asking GI to evolve programs which trade speed against the quality of answers they give. Of course it may be possible to find programs which are both faster and give better answers.

Mostly, genetic improvement makes typically small changes or edits (also known as mutations) to the program's source code but sometimes the mutations are made to assembly code, byte code or binary machine code.

== Tools ==
- GIN https://github.com/gintool/gin
- Magpie https://github.com/bloa/magpie
- PyGGI https://github.com/coinse/pyggi
