= Distcc =

Tool for speeding up code compilation

distcc
- Original author: Martin Pool
- Developer: Fergus Henderson
- Stable release: 3.4 / 11 May 2021; 5 years ago
- Written in: C, C++, Python
- Operating system: Cross-platform
- Type: Compiler
- License: GNU General Public License
- Website: distcc.org
- Repository: github.com/distcc/distcc

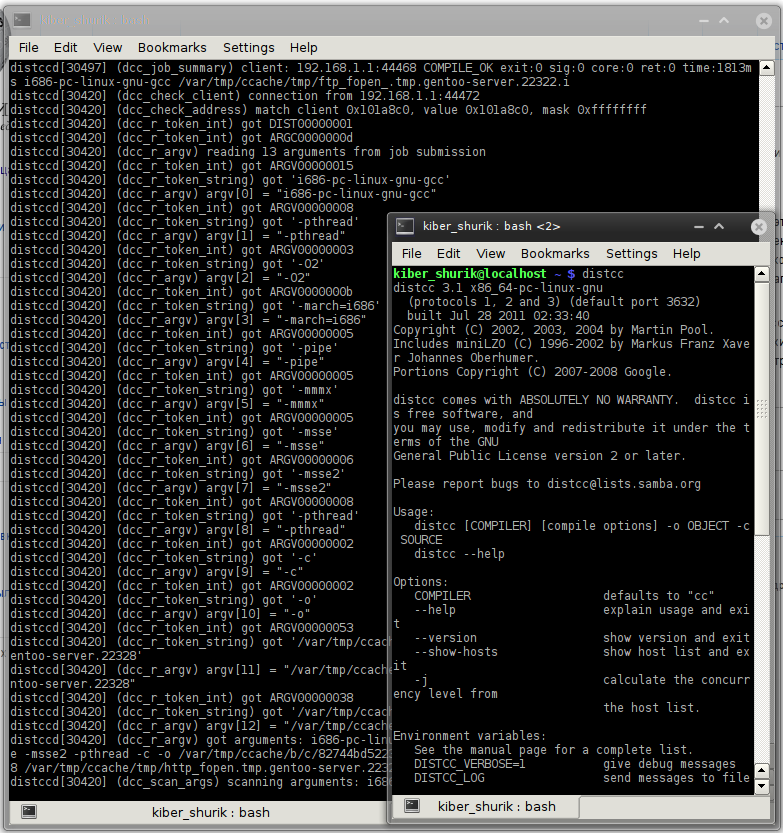
Distcc

In software development, distcc is a tool for speeding up compilation of source code by using distributed computing over a computer network. With the right configuration, distcc can dramatically reduce a project's compilation time.

It is designed to work with the C programming language (and its derivatives like C++ and Objective-C) and to use GCC as its backend, though it provides varying degrees of compatibility with the Intel C++ Compiler and Sun Microsystems' Sun Studio Compiler Suite. Distributed under the terms of the GNU General Public License, distcc is free software.

== Design ==
distcc is designed to speed up compilation by taking advantage of unused processing power on other computers. A machine with distcc installed can send code to be compiled across the network to a computer which has the distccd daemon and a compatible compiler installed.

distcc works as an agent for the compiler. A distcc daemon has to run on each of the participating machines. The originating machine invokes a preprocessor to handle header files, preprocessing directives (such as #ifdef) and the source files and sends the preprocessed source to other machines over the network via TCP either unencrypted or using SSH. Remote machines compile those source files without any local dependencies (such as libraries, header files or macro definitions) to object files and send them back to the originator for further compilation.

distcc version 3 supports a mode (called pump mode) in which included header files are sent to the remote machines, so that preprocessing is also distributed.

== Related software ==
distcc was an option for distributed builds in versions of Apple's Xcode development suite prior to 4.3, but has been removed.

=== Goma ===
Goma is a similar tool made by Google to replace distcc & ccache in compiling chromium.

=== Ccache ===
ccache is another tool aimed to reduce the compilation time by caching the output from the same input source files. ccache can also use distcc as its backend, providing distributed compiling if it is not already cached by using the CCACHE_PREFIX environment variable.

=== Icecream ===
icecream was created by SUSE based on distcc. Like distcc, icecream takes compile jobs from a build and distributes it among remote machines allowing a parallel build. But unlike distcc, icecream uses a central server that dynamically schedules the compile jobs to the fastest free server.

== See also ==
- Compile farm
- FlowTracer
- IncrediBuild
- Electric Cloud
