= Altair FlowTracer =

Build management tool

FlowTracer
- Developer: Runtime Design Automation
- Stable release: 2010.06 / June, 2010; 16 years ago
- Operating system: Cross-platform
- Type: Programming tool
- Website: www.rtda.com/product/flowtracer/

Altair FlowTracer, previously known as FlowTracer and Flowtracer/EDA, is a commercial build management tool developed by Altair Engineering. The product was originally developed by Runtime Design Automation (RTDA) before Altair acquired the company.

FlowTracer allows one to describe the basic flow of a software build in a Tcl-like language (Flow Description Language) or at execution time. The tool will then store and track the inputs and outputs of the flow in its database, automatically detecting changes as they occur. The tool provides a GUI to visualize, control and diagnose the workflow, for example with instant notification of failures.

FlowTracer is a commercial alternative to make and distcc. It uses "makefiles" written in a proprietary format. It supports multiple platforms such as Linux and other Unix variants (AIX, HP-UX, Solaris), as well as macOS and Microsoft Windows.
