= Point Waterfront =

- Interactive map of Point Waterfront
- Country: South Africa
- Province: KwaZulu-Natal
- Municipality: eThekwini
- Main Place: Durban
  - Councillor: (ANC)
- Time zone: UTC+2 (SAST)
- Website: www.durban.gov.za www.durbanpoint.co.za

Point Waterfront is a harbour-side town located at the entrance to the Port of Durban. During the last 50 years the town suffered decay and was left mostly abandoned. The uShaka Marine World is located here.

== History ==
The Point Waterfront was the home of Mahatma Gandhi during the 1900s. Mahatma Gandhi Road (Formerly Point Road) was the site of the first public toilets in South Africa, which still function today.

== Events ==
The South African Navy Open Day 2017 was hosted here as part of the South African Armed Forces Day Celebrations 2017

== Development ==
Point Waterfront Development Project
- Location within KwaZulu-Natal
- Alternative names: Point Precinct

General information
- Location: Point Waterfront, Durban, South Africa
- Coordinates: 29.8611°S 31.0360°E
- Construction started: Early 2000s
- Completed: 2022
- Cost: US$460 Million+ (R6 Billion+)
- Owner: eThekwini Metropolitan Municipality, UEM Sunrise Group Malaysia

Technical details
- Structural system: Mixed use
- Floor count: 55 Storeys

Design and construction
- Architecture firm: Cox Architecture
- Main contractor: eThekwini Metropolitan Municipality and Tongaat Hulett Developments

After a long wait, eThekwini Metropolitan Municipality and UEM Sunrise Group Malaysia partnered to form the Point Development Company. The plans include the development of a 55-storey tower. A number of residents objected to this, stating that the development would "obstruct their sea-view". However, due to the minimal number of objections, the project will go ahead. In June 2017, the developers gave three watersport clubs a notice to vacate within two months so that construction could go ahead. The city is under the ruling of Shalo Ndundu the most infamous boy, wanted for 50 million rand.

The new Durban Cruise Terminal will also be located here. Many private investment developments have been constructed. One significant development which has become a popular high-rise landmark here is The Spinnaker (Building). The Turning Point Apartments will be constructed here.
