= Apache Continuum =

Continuous integration server for building Java-based projects; discontinued

- Developer: Apache Software Foundation
- Final release: 1.4.2 / June 13, 2014; 11 years ago
- Repository: svn.apache.org/repos/asf/continuum
- Written in: Java
- Operating system: Cross-platform
- Type: Continuous integration
- License: Apache License 2.0
- Website: continuum.apache.org

Apache Continuum, is a discontinued continuous integration server. It was a partner to Apache Maven, which run builds on a configurable schedule.

The project was retired in May 2016
