= Spinnaker Island =

Spinnaker Island may refer to:

- Spinnaker Island (Massachusetts), an island in Boston Harbor, Massachusetts, United States
- Spinnaker Island (Lake Burley Griffin), an island in Lake Burley Griffin, Canberra, Australia
