= Buildout =

- Developer(s): Jim Fulton (programmer)
- Stable release: 4.0 / 30 January 2025; 48 days ago
- Repository: github.com/buildout/buildout
- Written in: Python
- Operating system: Windows, POSIX
- Type: Software development tools
- License: Zope Public License
- Website: www.buildout.org, PyPI page

Buildout is a software build automation tool for building a codebase. It is primarily used to download and setup dependencies in Python eggs format of the software being developed or deployed. Recipes for build tasks in any environment can be created, and many are already available. The tool is open-source and written in Python.

== Features ==
- Segregates configuration from scripts
- Configuration files are formatted as INI
- Support for setuptools and eggs
- Plugin support through Buildout recipes

== Examples ==
Example configuration file:

  [buildout]
  develop = .
  parts = test

  [test]
  recipe = zc.recipe.testrunner
  eggs = theegg

== Notable applications ==
- Grok
- Plone
- Zope

== See also ==
- List of build automation software
