= Kohsuke Kawaguchi =

Jenkins creator and computer programmer (born 1977)

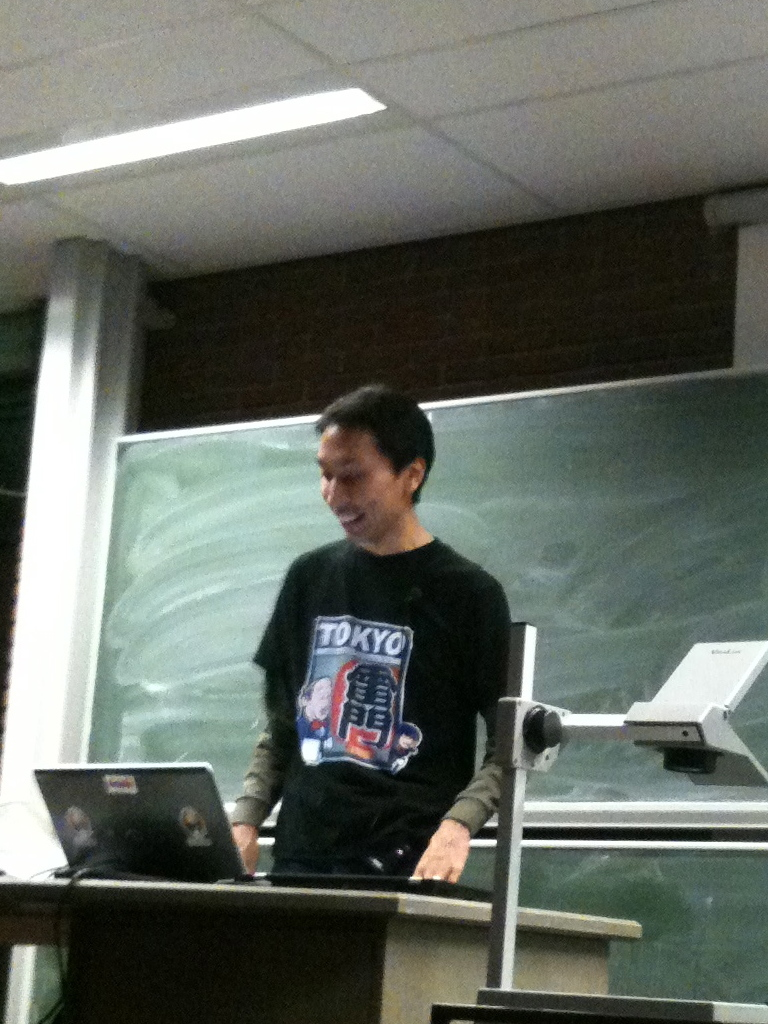
- Born: 1977; Bunkyō (Japan)
- Awards: O'Reilly Open Source Award (2011)
- Website: kohsuke.org

Kohsuke Kawaguchi (Japanese: 川口 耕介, Hepburn: Kawaguchi Kōsuke; born 1977) is a computer programmer who is best known as the creator of the Jenkins software project. While working at Sun Microsystems, he was the primary developer of the Hudson project. He is also the recipient of the 2011 O'Reilly Open Source Award for his work on the Jenkins project.

== Career ==
He worked at Sun Microsystems on numerous projects for the Java, XML and Solaris ecosystems, notably as the primary developer for Hudson and for Multi Schema Validator. Hudson was created in summer of 2004 and first released in February 2005.

When Oracle bought Sun, an issue arose in the Hudson community with respect to the infrastructure used, which grew to encompass questions over the stewardship and control by Oracle. Negotiations between the principal project contributors and Oracle took place, and although there were many areas of agreement a key sticking point was the trademarked name "Hudson", after Oracle claimed the right to the name and applied for a trademark in December 2010. As a result, on January 11, 2011, a call for votes was made to change the project name from "Hudson" to "Jenkins". The proposal was overwhelmingly approved by community vote on January 29, 2011, creating the Jenkins project. On February 1, 2011, Oracle said that they intended to continue development of Hudson, and considered Jenkins a fork rather than a rename. Jenkins and Hudson therefore continue as two independent projects, each claiming the other is the fork.

Kawaguchi founded InfraDNA, Inc. in April 2010, which provided support and service for continuous integration using Hudson. In November 2010, InfraDNA merged with CloudBees. In 2011, he received Google-O'Reilly Open Source Award for his work on the Hudson/Jenkins projects.

In 2014, Kawaguchi became the Chief Technology Officer for CloudBees.

In January 2020, Kawaguchi transitioned to a CloudBees adviser and stepped away from Jenkins and CloudBees to focus on a new startup, Launchable, Inc.

In August 7th 2024, CloudBees announced its acquisition of Launchable, Inc.

== See also ==
- Hudson
- Jenkins
- CloudBees
