= The Spinnaker (building) =

Coordinates: 29.8699°S 31.0435°E

- Interactive map of the The Spinnaker area

General information
- Status: Completed
- Type: Apartments
- Location: 180 Mahatma Gandhi (former Point) Road Point Waterfront, Durban South Africa
- Completed: 2008

Technical details
- Floor count: 20+

The Spinnaker is a high-rise development in Point Waterfront in Durban, South Africa. It is the tallest building in the Point Waterfront Precinct. It was built as part of eThekwini Metropolitan Municipality's Urban regeneration plan and is one of South Africa's most significant property developments.
