= Piper (source control system) =

Version control system by Google

Piper is a centralized version control system used by Google for its internal software development. Originally designed for Linux, it has supported Microsoft Windows and macOS since October 2012.

== Scale ==
Since its founding years Google has used a central codebase. For over 10 years, Google relied on a single Perforce instance, using proprietary caching for scalability. The need for further scaling led to the development of Piper. Currently, Google's version control "is an extreme case": as of 2016, the repository was storing 86 terabytes of data comprising two billion lines of code in nine million files (two orders of magnitude more than in the Linux kernel repository). 25,000 developers contributed 16,000 changes daily, with an additional 24,000 commit operations by bots. Read requests each day are measured in billions.

== Architecture ==
Piper uses regular Google Cloud storage solutions, originally Bigtable and later Spanner, distributed across 10 data centers worldwide and replicated through the Paxos protocol.

== Use ==
When using Piper, developers apply changes to a local copy of files, similar to a working copy in Subversion, local clone in Git, or a client in Perforce. Updates made by other developers can be pulled from the central repository and merged into the local code. Commits are only allowed after a code review via the Critique tool.

Typical use involves Clients in the Cloud (CitC). This system utilizes cloud backend and a local FUSE filesystem to create an illusion of changes overlaid on top of a full repository. This approach enables seamless browsing and use of standard Unix tools without explicit synchronization operations, thus keeping the local copy very small (average size of a local copy is less than ten files). All file writes are mapped to snapshots thus permitting restoration of the previous states of the code without explicit snapshotting. Due to its always-connected operation, CitC allows easy switching of computers, as well as sharing modified code with other developers, and use of the automated build system and testing tools. As a result, the majority of Google developers practices trunk-based development with no personal branches; the branches are mostly used for releases.

== Security ==
Most of the codebase is visible to all developers, sensitive individual files (less than 1% as of 2016) are access-controlled. All operations with Piper are logged; accidentally committed files can be purged.

== Sources ==
- Blank-Edelman, D.N. (2018). Seeking SRE: Conversations About Running Production Systems at Scale. O'Reilly Media. ISBN 978-1-4919-7881-8.
- Potvin, Rachel; Levenberg, Josh (2016-06-24). "Why Google stores billions of lines of code in a single repository". Communications of the ACM. 59 (7). Association for Computing Machinery (ACM): 78–87. doi:10.1145/2854146. ISSN 0001-0782.
- Sadowski, Caitlin; Kurnia, Ilham; Rohlfs, Ben (2020-02-28). "Critique: Google's Code Review Tool". In Winters, Titus; Manshreck, Tom; Wright, Hyrum (eds.). Software Engineering at Google: Lessons Learned from Programming Over Time. O'Reilly Media, Inc. ISBN 978-1-4920-8276-7.
