= JUnit =

Java testing framework

- Developers: Kent Beck, Erich Gamma, David Saff
- Stable release: 6.0.1 / October 31, 2025; 10 months ago
- Written in: Java
- Operating system: Cross-platform
- Type: Unit testing tool
- License: Eclipse Public License 2.0 (relicensed previously)
- Website: junit.org
- Repository: github.com/junit-team/junit5

JUnit is a test automation framework for the Java programming language. JUnit is often used for unit testing, and is one of the xUnit frameworks.

JUnit is linked as a JAR at compile-time. The latest version of the framework, JUnit 6, resides under package org.junit.jupiter. Previous versions JUnit 4 and JUnit 3 were under packages org.junit and junit.framework, respectively.

A research survey performed in 2013 across 10,000 Java projects hosted on GitHub found that JUnit (in a tie with slf4j-api) was the most commonly included external library. Each library was used by 30.7% of projects.

== JUnit Lifecycle ==
Every JUnit test class usually has several test cases. These test cases are subject to the test life cycle. The full JUnit Lifecycle has three major phases:

1. Setup phase - This phase is where the test infrastructure is prepared. Two levels of setup are available. The first type of setup is class-level setup in which a computationally expensive object, such as a database connection, is created and reused, with minimal side effects. Class-level setup is implemented using the @BeforeAll annotation. The other type is setup before running each test case, which uses the @BeforeEach annotation.
2. Test execution - This phase is responsible for running the test and verifying the result. The test result will indicate if the test result is a success or a failure. The @Test annotation is used here.
3. Clean up phase - After all posttest executions are performed, the system may need to perform cleanup. Similar to class-level setup, there is a corresponding class-level clean up. The @AfterAll annotation is used to support class-level clean up. The @AfterEach annotation allows for cleanup after test execution.

== Integration with other tools ==
JUnit 6 integrates a number of tools, such as build tools, integrated development environments (IDE), continuous integration (CI) tools and many more.

=== Build Tools ===
JUnit supports Apache Ant, Apache Maven and Gradle build tools, which are the most widely used project build tools. Build tools are vital for automating the process of building the project.

==== Ant Extension ====
Apache Ant, also known as Ant, is one of the build tools with the highest degree of versatility, and has the longest history out of the three build tools listed above. Ant centers around the build.xml file, used for configuring the tasks necessary to run a project. Ant also has an extension called Apache Ivy, which helps deal with dependency resolution. The project dependencies can be declared in the ivy.xml file. Ant can integrate with JUnit 5 and later by configuring the Java code coverage tools (JaCoCo), for the ivy.xml file. The ivy.xml can then be configured with the java-platform-console and junit-platform-runner dependencies to integrate with JUnit 5 and later.

==== Maven Extension ====
In contrast to Ant, Apache Maven, also known as Maven, uses a standardized and unified approach to the build process. Maven follows the paradigm of "convention over configuration" for managing its dependencies. The Java source code (or "src") can be found under the src/main/java directory, and the test files can be found under the src/test/java directory. Maven can be used for any Java Project. It uses the Project Object Model (POM), which is an XML-based approach to configuring the build steps for the project. The minimal Maven with the pom.xml build file must contain a list of dependencies and a unique project identifier. Maven must be available on the build path to work. Maven can integrate with JUnit 5 and later using the jacoco-maven-plugin plugin which supports out-of-box functionality for JUnit tests. Different Maven goals can be specified to achieve these tasks.

==== Gradle Extension ====
Gradle is a build tool that borrows many concepts from its predecessors, Ant and Maven. It uses the build.gradle file to declare the steps required for the project build. Unlike Ant and Maven, which are XML-based, Gradle requires the use of Apache Groovy, which is a Java-based programming language. Unlike Ant and Maven, Gradle does not require the use of XML. Gradle still adheres to Maven's "convention over configuration" approach, and follows the same structure for src/main/java and src/test/java directories. Gradle can integrate with JUnit 5 and later by configuring a plugin jacoco alongside the junit-platform plug-in given by the JUnit team in the build file.

== JUnit Extension Model ==
JUnit follows the paradigm of preferring extension points over features. The JUnit team decided not to put all features within the JUnit core, and instead decided to give an extensible way for developers to address their concerns.

In JUnit 4, there are two extension mechanisms: the Runner API and Rule API. There were some disadvantages to both the Runner API and the Rule API.

A major limitation of the Runner API is that developers must implement the entire test lifecycle, even if only a specific phase is required. This is too complicated and heavyweight for most use cases. Another major limitation is that only one runner class can be used per test case, which makes runners non-composable. For example, Mockito and Parameterized runners cannot be used together within the same test class.

A major limitation of the Rule API is that it cannot control the entire test lifecycle and is therefore unsuitable for certain use cases. Rules are only suitable for operations that need to run before or after test execution. Another limitation is that class-level and method-level rules must be defined separately.

In JUnit 5 and later, the extension API is found within the JUnit Jupiter Engine. The JUnit Team wants to allow the developer to hook to separate stages of a test life cycle by providing a single unified extension API. Upon reaching a certain life cycle phase, the Jupiter Engine will invoke all registered extensions for that phase. The developer can hook into five major extension points:

1. Test lifecycle callbacks – allow developers to execute code at specific test lifecycle phases.
2. Test instance post-processing – enables developers to hook into the test instance creation phase using the TestInstancePostProcessor interface.
3. Conditional test execution – allows tests to run only if certain conditions are met.
4. Parameter resolution – allows parameters to be injected into test methods or constructors.
5. Exception handling – allows developers to modify test behavior in response to exceptions instead of failing the test outright.

== Example of a JUnit test fixture ==
A JUnit test fixture is a Java object. Test methods must be annotated by the @Test annotation. If the situation requires it, it is also possible to define a method to execute before (or after) each (or all) of the test methods with the @BeforeEach (or @AfterEach) and @BeforeAll (or @AfterAll) annotations.

import org.junit.jupiter.api.*;

class FoobarTests {
    @BeforeAll
    static void setUpClass() throws Exception {
        // Code executed before the first test method
    }

    @BeforeEach
    void setUp() throws Exception {
        // Code executed before each test
    }
 
    @Test
    void oneThing() {
        // Code that tests one thing
    }

    @Test
    void anotherThing() {
        // Code that tests another thing
    }

    @Test
    void somethingElse() {
        // Code that tests something else
    }

    @AfterEach
    void tearDown() throws Exception {
        // Code executed after each test 
    }
 
    @AfterAll
    static void tearDownClass() throws Exception {
        // Code executed after the last test method 
    }
}

== Previous versions of JUnit ==
According to Martin Fowler, one of the early adopters of JUnit:

JUnit was born on a flight from Zurich to the 1997 OOPSLA in Atlanta. Kent was flying with Erich Gamma, and what else were two geeks to do on a long flight but program? The first version of JUnit was built there, pair programmed, and done test first (a pleasing form of meta-circular geekery).

As a side effect of its wide use, previous versions of JUnit remain popular, with JUnit 4 having over 100,000 usages by other software components on the Maven Central repository.

In JUnit 4, the annotations for test execution callbacks were @BeforeClass, @Before, @After, and @AfterClass, as opposed to JUnit 5's @BeforeAll, @BeforeEach, @AfterEach, and @AfterAll.

In JUnit 3, test fixtures had to inherit from junit.framework.TestCase. Additionally, test methods had to be prefixed with 'test'.

== See also ==
- xUnit, the family name given to testing frameworks including JUnit
- SUnit, the original Smalltalk version written by Kent Beck based on which JUnit was written
- TestNG, another test framework for Java
- Mock object, a technique used during unit testing
- Mockito, a mocking library to assist in writing tests
- EvoSuite, a tool to automatically generate JUnit tests
- List of Java Frameworks
