= Ccache =

Software development tool

- Original author: Andrew Tridgell
- Developer: Joel Rosdahl
- Release: April 19, 2002; 24 years ago
- Stable release: 4.14.3 / November 8, 2026; 0 days ago
- Written in: C++
- Operating system: Unix-like, Windows
- Platform: Cross-platform
- Available in: English
- Type: Compiling tools
- License: GPLv3
- Website: ccache.dev
- Repository: github.com/ccache/ccache

Ccache is a software development tool that caches compiler output so that subsequent identical compilations can be avoided and the results can be taken from the cache. This can greatly speed up recompilation time. The detection is done by hashing different kinds of information that should be unique for the compilation and then using the hash sum to identify the cached output. Ccache is free software licensed under the GNU General Public License version 3 or later.

== See also ==
- distcc
