= Spinnaker (software) =

Continuous delivery software platform

- Developers: Netflix Team, Harness, Google, OpsMx
- Release: November 16, 2015; 10 years ago
- Stable release: 1.30.1 / April 7, 2023; 3 years ago
- Written in: Java, Apache Groovy, TypeScript, Kotlin
- Platform: Linux
- License: Apache License 2.0
- Website: www.spinnaker.io
- Repository: github.com/spinnaker/spinnaker

Spinnaker is a free and open-source continuous delivery software platform originally developed by Netflix and extended by Google. It is designed to work with Kubernetes, Google Cloud Platform, AWS, Microsoft Azure and Oracle Cloud.

Spinnaker was developed by Netflix as a successor to the internally developed Asgard. It was released under the Apache License 2.0 on November 16, 2015 and has been adopted by tech companies.

== Summit ==
An annual summit on Spinnaker software is held; the 2019 summit took place in San Diego, California on 15–17 November.

The third annual Spinnaker Summit will be co-located with the CD Foundation's cdCon. Day Zero of cdCon is dedicated to Spinnaker topics. After the first day, a Spinnaker track continues as part of main cdCon schedule. cdCon will be fully virtual and held June 23 – 24, 2021.

== Commercial vendors ==
There are companies commercially supporting Spinnaker. Current list of vendors:

- Armory
- OpsMx
