= Premake =

Cross-platform build tool for configuring platform-specific builds

- Original author(s): Jason Perkins
- Stable release: 4.3 / 16 November 2010; 14 years ago
- Preview release: 5.0.0-beta4 / 30 December 2024; 2 months ago
- Repository: github.com/premake/premake-4.x; github.com/premake/premake-core
- Written in: C, Lua
- Type: build automation tool
- License: 3-clause BSD License
- Website: premake.github.io

Premake is a software development tool for generating build configuration files for platform specific build tools based on configuration files that are platform agnostic. The tool is open-source.

== Features ==
Notable features include:

- Supports building a codebase written in C, C++, and C#
- Support for generating build configuration files for Visual Studio, GNU Make, Xcode, Code::Blocks, CodeLite, and MonoDevelop
- Can build on different environments using the same premake configuration files

== Examples ==
The following is an example premake configuration file.

solution "MySolution"
  configurations { "Debug", "Release" }

project "MyProject"
  kind "ConsoleApp"
  language "C++"
  includedirs { "include" }
  files { "src/**.h", "src/**.cpp" }

  configuration "Debug"
    symbols "On"
    defines { "_DEBUG" }

  configuration "Release"
    flags { "Optimize" }
    defines { "NDEBUG" }

== Notable uses ==
Projects that use Premake include: 0 A.D., Bullet, Open Dynamics Engine, VDrift, and wxFormBuilder,
