= List of acronyms: X =

This list contains acronyms, initialisms, and pseudo-blends that begin with the letter X.

For the purposes of this list:

- acronym = an abbreviation pronounced as if it were a word, e.g., SARS = severe acute respiratory syndrome, pronounced to rhyme with cars
- initialism = an abbreviation pronounced wholly or partly using the names of its constituent letters, e.g., CD = compact disc, pronounced cee dee
- pseudo-blend = an abbreviation whose extra or omitted letters mean that it cannot stand as a true acronym, initialism, or portmanteau (a word formed by combining two or more words).

(a) = acronym, e.g.: SARS – (a) severe acute respiratory syndrome
(i) = initialism, e.g.: CD – (i) compact disc
(p) = pseudo-blend, e.g.: UNIFEM – (p) United Nations Development Fund for Women
(s) = symbol (none of the above, representing and pronounced as something else; for example: MHz – megahertz)

Some terms are spoken as either acronym or initialism, e.g., VoIP, pronounced both as voyp and V-O-I-P.

(Main list of acronyms)

== XA ==
- XAF – (s) BEAC (Banque des états de l'Afrique centrale) Central Africa CFA (Coopération financière en Afrique centrale) franc (ISO 4217 currency code)
- XAG – (s) Silver Troy ounce (ISO 4217 currency code)
- XAU – (s) Gold Troy ounce (ISO 4217 currency code)

== XB ==
- XBA – (s) European Composite Unit (EURCO; Bonds market unit) (ISO 4217 currency code)
- XBB – (s) European Monetary Unit (E.M.U.; Bonds market unit) (ISO 4217 currency code)
- XBML – (p) eXtended Business Modelling Language

== XC ==
- XC – (s) Ninety (in Roman numerals)
- XCBL – (i) XML Common Business Library
- XCD – (s) East Caribbean dollar (ISO 4217 currency code)

== XD ==
- XD – Used in chatrooms or email for smiley face. X is the eyes; squinted D is the mouth; XD.

== XE ==
- Xe – (s) Xenon

== XF ==
- XF
  - (s) Automobile made by Jaguar
  - (s) Truck made by DAF Trucks
  - (p) IATA code for Vladivostok Air
- XFA – (i) XML Forms Architecture
- XFC – (i) Xtreme Fighting Championships
- XFD – (s) Fighter aircraft made by Douglas
- Xfe – (i) X File Explorer
- XFF – (i) X-Forwarded-For
- XFG – (p) Exfoliation glaucoma
- XFH
  - (s) 1932 prototype U.S. Navy fighter aircraft made by Hall
  - (i) X-ray fluorescence holography
- XFN
  - (i) XHTML Friends Network
  - (p) IATA code for Xiangyang Liuji Airport
- XFR – (s) Automobile made by Jaguar
- XFT – (p) X FreeType interface library
- XFW – (p) IATA code for Hamburg Finkenwerder Airport

== XG ==
- XG – (s) Automobile made by Hyundai
- XGA – (p) Extended Graphics Array
- XGE
  - (i) Xoreax Grid Engine
  - (s) Signal for "I Surrender"
- XGG – (p) IATA code for Gorom Gorom Airport
- XGN – (p) IATA code for Xangongo Airport
- XGP – (p) Extreme Game Player
- XGR – (p) IATA code for Kangiqsualujjuag (Georges River) Airport

== XH ==
- xh – (s) Xhosa language (ISO 639-1 code)
- xho – (s) Xhosa language (ISO 639-2 code)
- XHTML – (p) eXtensible Hypertext Markup Language
- XHR – (p) eXtra high Image resolution – XMLHTTPRequest

== XI ==
- XI – (s) Eleven (in Roman numerals)
- XII – (s) Twelve (in Roman numerals)
- XIII – (s) Thirteen (in Roman numerals)
- XIV – (s) Fourteen (in Roman numerals)
- XIX – (s) Nineteen (in Roman numerals)

== XJ ==
- XJ
  - (s) Automobile made by Jaguar
  - (s) Automobile made by Jeep
- XJL
  - (s) Amphibian aircraft made by Columbia
  - (s) Automobile made by Jaguar
- XJS – (s) Automobile made by Jaguar

== XK ==
- XK
  - (s) Automobile made by Jaguar
  - (s) Automobile made by Jeep
  - (s) Kell blood group precursor
- XKA – (p) IATA code for Kantchari Airport
- XKB – (p) X keyboard extension
- XKE – (s) Automobile made by Jaguar
- XKH – (p) IATA code for Xieng Khouang Airport
- XKR – (s) Automobile made by Jaguar
- XKS – (p) IATA code for Kasabonika Airport
- XKY – (p) IATA code for Kaya Airport

== XL ==
- XL
  - (p) eXtra Large
  - (s) Forty (in Roman numerals)

== XM ==
- XML – (p) eXtensible Markup Language
- XMSF – (p) eXtensible Modelling and Simulation Framework

== XN ==
- XN – (s) Christian – (s) Nordic Patent Institute
- XNA
  - (p) IATA code for Northwest Arkansas Regional Airport
  - (i) X-No-Archive
  - (i) Xeno Nucleic Acid
- XNAY - X-No-Archive: yes
- XNC – (i) X Northern Captain
- XNN – (p) IATA code for Xining Caojiabao Airport
- XNS
  - (i) Xerox Network Systems
  - (p) Extensible Name Service
  - (s) Christians
- XNU – (p) X is Not Unix

== XO ==
- XO
  - (i) Χριστιανός Ορθόδοξος (Xristianos Orthodoksos, Greek for "Eastern Orthodoxy")
  - (p) eXecutive Officer
  - eXtra Old (brandy grade)
- XOF – (s) BCÉAO (Banque centrale des états de l'Afrique de l'Ouest) West African CFA (Communauté financière d'Afrique) franc (ISO 4217 currency code)

== XP ==
- XP – (p) eXperience Point (role-playing games)
- XPD – (s) Palladium Troy ounce (ISO 4217 currency code)
- XPF – (s) CFP franc (ISO 4217 currency code)
- XPT – (s) Platinum Troy ounce (ISO 4217 currency code)

== XQ ==
- XQJ – (p) XQuery API for Java™
- XQP – (p) IATA code for Quepos La Managua Airport
- XQU – (p) IATA code for Qualicum Beach Airport

== XR ==
- XRML – (p) eXtensible Rights Markup Language
- XRP – (s) a cryptocurrency

== XS ==
- XS – (i) Xiaolin Showdown -(s) Extra Small
- XSL – (p) eXtensible Style Language

== XT ==
- XTMH – eXtreme Technology Multiprocessor Hyperlanguage

== XU ==
- XUL – (p) XML User Interface Language

== XV ==
- XV – (s) Fifteen (in Roman numerals)
- XVA – an X-Value Adjustment (in finance)
- XVI – (s) Sixteen (in Roman numerals)
- XVII – (s) Seventeen (in Roman numerals)
- XVIII – (s) Eighteen (in Roman numerals)

== XW ==
- XWB – (p) (Airbus A350) "Extra Wide Body"
- XWF – (i) Xcitement Wrestling Federation
- XWM – (i) X window manager
- XWN – (p) eXtended WordNet
- XWS – (i) X Window System

== XX ==
- XX – (s) Twenty (in Roman numerals)
- XXX – (s) Hardcore pornography (film rating) – Thirty (in Roman numerals)

== XY ==
- XYA – (p) IATA code for Yandina Airport
- Xyl – (s) Xylobium

== XZ ==
- XZA – (p) IATA code for Zabré Airport
- XZN – (s) Triple square screw driver
