= C100 =

C100 may refer to:

- Alcotán C-100, an anti-tank rocket launcher model
- Chase-Sisley C100-S, a glider
- Honda Super Cub C100 motorcycle
- CIOO-FM (C100), a Canadian radio station
- Equal Remuneration Convention, 1951 (C100)
- Canon EOS C100, a digital cinema camera made by Canon
- Adtranz C-100, a people mover manufactured by Adtranz, now Bombardier Transportation.
- SpaceX Dragon 1, the C100-series Dragon space capsules

== See also ==
- C1000
- 100 (disambiguation)
- C10 (disambiguation)
- C1 (disambiguation)
- C (disambiguation)
