= XFH =

XFH may refer to:

- Hall XFH, a prototype U.S. Navy fighter aircraft of the 1932s
- X-ray fluorescence holography, an imaging method
