= Cuban intervention in Angola =

1975–1991 operation in southwestern Africa

- Part of the Angolan Civil War and the South African Border War
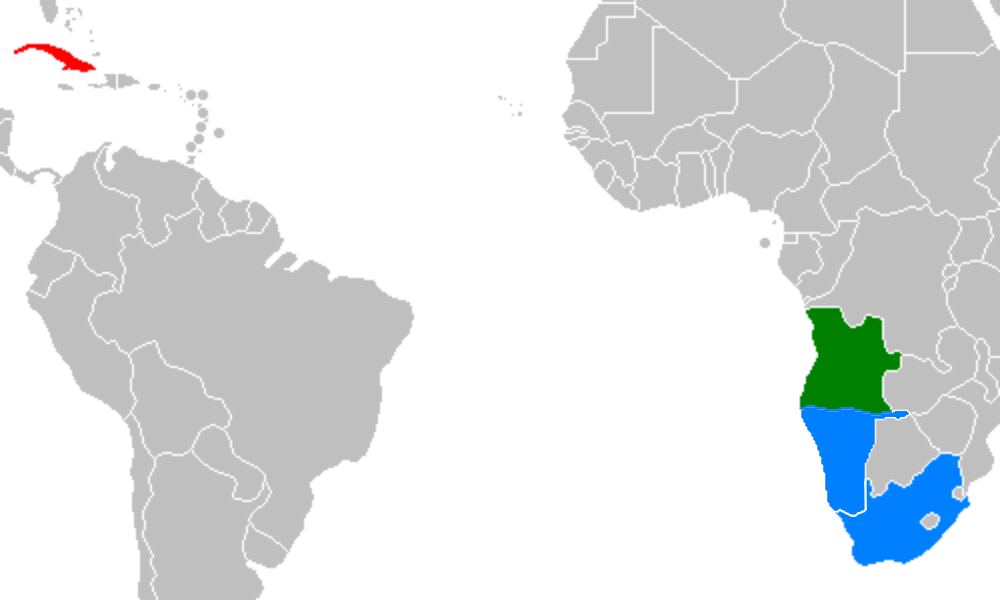
- Location of Cuba (red), Angola (green), and South Africa (blue), including South West Africa
Date	1975–1991
Location	Angola
Result	Cuban and South African withdrawal in 1991

Belligerents
Cuba; MPLA; Soviet Union; SWAPO	UNITA; FNLA (until 1978); South Africa; FLEC

Strength
(Cuba) Cuban troops: 36,000 (1976); 35,000–37,000 (1982); 60,000 (1988); Total Cuban troops: 337,033–380,000: 1,000 tanks; 600 vehicles; 1,600 artillery pieces; Grad MLRS; Mi-24 Attack helicopters; MiG-23 jet fighters; MPLA troops: 40,000 (1976); 70,000 (1987); (Soviet Union) Soviet troops: Altogether 11,000 (1975 to 1991)	UNITA militants: 65,000 (1990, highest); FNLA militants: 22,000 (1975); 4,000–7,000 (1976); (Union of South Africa) South African troops: 7,000 (1975–76); 6,000 (1987–88)

Casualties and losses
Unknown (Cuba) 2,016 dead (786 combat, 524 disease, 706 accidents) (Note: Both Cubans and South Africans underreported their KIA.) (Soviet Union) 54 killed	Unknown (South Africa) 715 dead Unknown; Unknown
- 1,000,000 dead or wounded

The Cuban intervention in Angola (codenamed Operation Carlota) began on 5 November 1975, when Cuba sent combat troops in support of the communist-aligned People's Movement for the Liberation of Angola (MPLA) against the pro-western coalition of the National Union for the Total Independence of Angola (UNITA), and the National Liberation Front of Angola (FNLA). The intervention came after the outbreak of the Angolan Civil War, which occurred after the former Portuguese colony was granted independence after the Angolan War of Independence. The previously unimportant civil war quickly developed into a major proxy war between the Eastern Bloc (led by the Soviet Union) and the Western Bloc (led by the United States). Apartheid South Africa and the United States backed UNITA and the FNLA, while communist nations backed the MPLA.

Around 4,000 Cuban troops fought to push back a three-pronged advance by the SADF, UNITA, FNLA, and Zairean troops. 18,000 Cuban troops then proved instrumental in defeating FNLA forces in the north and UNITA in the south. The Cuban army helped the MPLA in repressing separatists from the Front for the Liberation of the Enclave of Cabinda (FLEC). By 1976, the Cuban military presence in Angola had grown to nearly 36,000 troops. By effectively driving out the internationally isolated South African forces, Cuba was able to secure control over all the provincial capitals in Angola. Following the withdrawal of Zaire and South Africa, Cuban forces remained in Angola to support the MPLA government against UNITA in the continuing civil war. South Africa spent the following decade launching bombing and strafing raids from its bases in South West Africa into southern Angola, while UNITA engaged in ambushes, hit-and-run attacks, and harassment of Cuban units.

In 1988, Cuban troops, now amounting to around 55,000 troops, intervened to avert a military disaster in a Soviet-led People's Armed Forces of Liberation of Angola (FAPLA) offensive against UNITA, which was still supported by South Africa, leading to the Battle of Cuito Cuanavale and the opening of a second front. This turn of events was considered to have been the major impetus to the success of the ongoing peace talks leading to the 1988 New York Accords, the agreement by which Cuban and South African forces withdrew from Angola while South West Africa gained its independence from South Africa. Cuban military engagement in Angola ended in 1991, while the Angolan Civil War continued until 2002. Between 1975 and 1991, Cuban casualties in Angola totaled approximately 10,000 dead, wounded, or missing. Between 1975 and 1989, during the Cuban intervention, more than 500,000 Angolans were killed (either in combat or indirectly through bombing, landmines, and starvation), at least another 500,000 were injured or crippled, and over $30 billion in damage was inflicted on Angola.

== Background ==
=== Failure of the Alvor Agreement and Civil War ===
The Carnation Revolution began in Portugal on 25 April 1974. The revolution took the world by surprise and caught the independence movements in Portugal's last African colonies unprepared. As a result of negotiations between Portugal and the Liberation Front of Mozambique, Mozambique was granted independence on 25 June 1974, but Angolan control remained disputed between the three rival independence movements: MPLA, FNLA, and UNITA in Angola-proper and the Front for the Liberation of the Enclave of Cabinda (FLEC) in Cabinda.

Until independence, the movements' priority lay in fighting the colonial power and they initially had no clear alliances. With the disappearance of Portugal as their common foe, ethnic and ideological rivalries were prioritized. Fighting between the three already broke out in November 1974, starting in Luanda and quickly spreading across all of Angola. The new leftist Portuguese government showed little interest in interfering but often favored the MPLA. The country soon fell apart into different spheres of influence, the FNLA taking hold of northern Angola and UNITA in the central south. The MPLA mostly held the coastline, the far southeast, and, in November 1974 gained control of Cabinda. The disunity of the three main movements postponed the handing over of power. The Alvor Agreement, which the three and Portugal signed on 15 January, proved not to be a solid foundation for the procedure. The transitional government that the agreement provided for was equally composed of the three main independence movements and Portugal. It was sworn in on 31 January 1975; Independence Day was set for 11 November 1975, the same day as the ceasefire. FLEC was not part of the deal because it fought for the independence of Cabinda, which the Portuguese had administratively joined as an exclave to Angola.

Fighting in Luanda (referred to as the "Second War of Liberation" by the MPLA) resumed hardly a day after the transitional government took office, when Agostinho Neto took advantage of the ceasefire to launch a purge of his rival Daniel Chipenda's supporters within the MPLA. The Chipenda faction was largely annihilated, leaving the FLNA as the only remaining obstacle to MPLA control of the city. Chipenda and 2,000 of his surviving troops defected to FLNA around February, which further heightened tensions. FNLA troops, flown in from Zaire, had been taking positions in Luanda since October 1974. The MPLA followed later in smaller numbers. To that point, the MPLA and UNITA "had given every sign of intending to honour the Alvor agreement". However, fighting broke out in Luanda between the FNLA and the MPLA. The FNLA was backed by Mobutu, the U.S., and China. By March, the FNLA from northern Angola was driving on Luanda joined by units of the Zairian army which the U.S. had encouraged Mobutu to provide.

On 28 April 1975, the FNLA unleashed a second wave of attacks, and in early May, 200 Zairian troops crossed into northern Angola in its support. Neto requested the Soviets increase its military aid to the MPLA. During March 1975, Soviet pilots flew thirty planeloads of weapons into Brazzaville, where they were then transported to Luanda. The Soviet Union airlifted thirty million dollars' worth of weaponry to the MPLA in three months, while Cuba deployed a contingent of 230 military advisers and technicians to the MPLA, with the first advisers arriving in May.

The fighting intensified with street clashes in April and May, and UNITA became involved after over two hundred of its members were massacred by an MPLA contingent in June 1975. The initially weaker MPLA retreated south, but with supplies finally arriving from the Soviet Union then succeeded in driving the FNLA out of Luanda by 9 July 1975, and UNITA voluntarily withdrew to its stronghold in the south. The FNLA took up positions east of Quifangondo at the eastern outskirts of the capital, from where it kept up its pressure and eliminated all remaining MPLA presence in the northern provinces of Uíge and Zaire.

By August, the MPLA had control of 11 of the 15 provincial capitals, including Cabinda and Luanda. The fight had spread throughout the whole country. The independence movements attempted to seize key strategic points, most importantly the capital on the independence day.

=== Foreign involvement ===
Starting in the early 1960s, the three major independence movements received support from a wide range of countries, sometimes even from the same ones. By the time of independence, FNLA and UNITA had received aid from the United States, Zaire, South Africa, and China.

As long as Portugal was present in Angola, the movements had to have their headquarters in independent neighbouring countries, making Congo-Léopoldville (Democratic Republic of the Congo, formerly Belgian), for both MPLA and FNLA a logical choice. After its expulsion from Kinshasa in November 1963, the MPLA moved across the Congo River to formerly French Congo-Brazzaville in the Republic of the Congo where it was invited by its new leftist government. The FNLA stayed in Congo-Léopoldville to which it remained closely tied and from where it received the bulk of its support. FNLA leader Holden Roberto was linked to Mobutu by marriage and obligated to him for many past favours. Over the years, the FNLA had become little more than an extension of Mobutu's own armed forces. Much of Zaire's support came indirectly from the U.S., which Zaire's leader Mobutu had close ties with. Zaire was the first country to send troops to Angola in March 1975 and to engage in fighting against the MPLA by the summer of that year.

In the summer of 1974, China was first to act after the Portuguese Revolution and posted 200 military instructors to Zaire where they trained FNLA troops and supplied military assistance. Chinese involvement was a measure against Soviet influence rather than that from western countries. On 27 October 1975, they were also the first to withdraw their military instructors. UNITA, which split away from FNLA in 1965/66 was initially Maoist and received some support from China. China had been training Mobutu's elite division, the Kamanyola, also trained the FNLA but withdrew their support for Zaire and the FNLA by the end of December 1975. In 1975 China were also the first to pull out of the area after the Portuguese Revolution. When their support ceased FNLA and UNITA became firmly established in the western camp.

The United States had a history of supporting the Salazar regime in Portugal. They allowed NATO equipment to be used in Angola during the Independence War. U.S. support for the FNLA was taken up by the Kennedy administration in 1960. Holden Roberto had been on the Central Intelligence Agency's or CIA's payroll since 1963. On 7 July 1974, the CIA started funding the FNLA on a small scale. On 22 January 1975, one week after the Alvor Accords were signed and just before the provisional government of Angola was to take office, the U.S. National Security Council's "40 Committee", which oversaw clandestine CIA operations, authorized US$300,000 in covert aid to the FNLA.

As the CIA was suspicious of the left-leaning MPLA, it "had no wish to see the US government deal with the MPLA" and it did not want them to be part of the transitional government. The US increased its support for the FNLA and for the first time took up funding of UNITA. On 18 July 1975, U.S. president Ford approved covert CIA operation "IAFEATURE" to aid FNLA and UNITA with money (US$30 million), arms and instructors. U.S. military instructors (CIA) arrived in southern Angola in early August, where they closely cooperated with their South African counterparts who arrived around the same time. The support involved the recruitment of mercenaries and an expanded propaganda campaign against the MPLA. Author Wayne Smith states that the U.S. "was publicly committed to an embargo against the delivery of arms to Angolan factions while it was secretly launching a paramilitary programme".

South Africa, which was then under a white-minority rule known as Apartheid, soon came to be the closest allies of both UNITA and FNLA. Other western countries with their own clandestine support for FNLA and UNITA were Great Britain and France. Israel supported the FNLA from 1963 to 1969 and the FNLA sent members to Israel for training. Through the 1970s Israel shipped arms to the FNLA via Zaire.

Some Eastern Bloc countries and Yugoslavia first established ties with the MPLA in the early 1960s during its struggle against the Portuguese. The Soviet Union started modest military aid in the late 1960s. This support remained clandestine, came in trickles and sometimes ceased altogether. This was the case in 1972, when the MPLA came under strong pressure from the Portuguese and was torn apart by internal strife (struggle between MPLA leader António Agostinho Neto and Chipenda from 1972 to 1974). Soviet aid was suspended in 1973 with the exception of a few limited shipments in 1974 to counter Chinese support for the FNLA; only Yugoslavia continued to send supplies to the MPLA. In response to U.S. and Chinese support for the FNLA, Soviet support for the MPLA massively increased in March 1975 in the form of arms deliveries by air via Brazzaville and by sea via Dar es Salaam. Soviet assistance to the MPLA was always somewhat reluctant; they never fully trusted Neto and their relationship was to remain ambivalent through the following years. The Soviets preferred a political solution, but they did not want to see the MPLA marginalized. Even after the South African incursions the Soviets only sent arms, but no instructors for the use of the sophisticated weapons. Among the other Eastern Bloc countries the MPLA had well established contacts with East Germany and Romania, the former shipping large amounts of non-military supplies. Although being leftist, Neto was interested in an ideological balance in his foreign support, but in spite of "overtures" well into 1975, he was unable to procure support for the MPLA from the U.S., thus becoming solely dependent on the eastern camp.

==== Cuba and the MPLA before the Civil War ====
Cuba's first informal contacts with the MPLA dated back to the late 1950s. MPLA guerrillas received their first training from Cubans in Algiers starting in 1963 and Che Guevara met MPLA-leader Agostinho Neto for the first high-level talks on 5 January 1965 in Brazzaville where Cuba was establishing a two-year military mission. This mission had the primary purpose to act as a strategic reserve for the Cuban operation in eastern Congo. It was also to provide assistance to the Alphonse Massemba-Débat government in Brazzaville and, at Neto's request, to the MPLA with its operations against the Portuguese in Cabinda and in northern Angola where its major foe was the FNLA. This co-operation marked the beginning of the Cuban-MPLA alliance which was to last 26 years.

The MPLA-Cuban operations in Cabinda and northern Angola were met with very little success and the Cubans ended the mission to Brazzaville as planned in July 1966. The MPLA moved its headquarters to Lusaka in early 1968. A few MPLA guerrillas continued to receive military training in Cuba but other contacts between Cuba and the MPLA cooled as Havana turned its attention to the independence struggle in Guinea-Bissau. Following Castro's tour of African countries in May 1972, Cuba stepped up its internationalist operations in Africa starting a training mission in Sierra Leone and smaller technical missions in Equatorial Guinea, Somalia, Algeria and Tanzania.

In a memorandum of 22 November 1972, the Cuban Major Manuel Piñeiro Losada communicated to Raúl Castro the MPLA's request for small amounts of training and crew. These considerations in 1972 bore no fruit and Cuba's attentions remained focused on Guinea-Bissau. It was only after the Portuguese Revolution that an MPLA delegation brought a request for economic aid, military training and arms to Cuba on 26 July 1974. In early October Cuba received another request, this time more urgent, for five Cuban military officers to help organize the MPLA army, FAPLA. In December 1974 and January 1975, Cuba sent Major Alfonso Perez Morales and Carlos Cadelo on a fact finding mission to Angola to assess the situation. In a letter of 26 January 1975, handed to Cadelo and Morales, Neto listed what the MPLA wanted from Cuba, including "The establishment, organization, and maintenance of a military school for cadres", "A [Cuban] ship to transport the war materiel that we have in Dar-es-Salaam to Angola", "Uniforms and military equipment for 10,000 men", and "Financial assistance while we are establishing and organizing ourselves."

Although Cuba was considering the establishment of a military mission (military training) in Angola, again there was no official response to this request. It was only reiterated by the MPLA in May 1975 when Cuban commander Flavio Bravo met Neto in Brazzaville while the Portuguese were preparing to withdraw from their African colonies. The MPLA's hopes for aid were turned to the Eastern Bloc countries from where not enough help materialised according to their wishes. Neto is quoted in a Cuban report complaining about Moscow's lacklustre support. He also expressed hope that the war in Angola would become "a vital issue in the fight against imperialism and socialism". But neither the Soviets nor the MPLA itself expected a major war to break out before independence. In March 1975 the MPLA sent 100 of its members for training in the Soviet Union and also requested financial assistance from Yugoslavia, which gave 100,000 dollars.

=== South Africa intervenes ===
Portugal's sudden retreat from Angola and Mozambique in 1975 ended a history of South African military and intelligence cooperation with Portugal against the Angolan and Namibian independence movements dating back to the 1960s, later formalized in a secret alliance code named Alcora Exercise. It also ended economic cooperation with regard to the Cunene hydro-project at the Angolan-Namibian border, which South Africa had financed.

South African involvement in Angola, subsumed under what it called the South African Border War, started in 1966 when the conflict with the Namibian independence movement, South West Africa People's Organization (SWAPO), which at that time had its bases in Ovamboland and Zambia, first flared up. With the loss of the Portuguese as an ally and the establishment of pro-SWAPO communist rule in the two former colonies, the apartheid regime lost highly valued sections of its "cordon sanitaire" (buffer zone) between itself and hostile black Africa.

In the following years South Africa engaged in numerous military and economic activities in the region, backing RENAMO in the Mozambican Civil War, undertaking various measures at economic destabilization against Botswana, Lesotho, Malawi, Mozambique, Swaziland, Tanzania, Zambia, and Zimbabwe, backing an unsuccessful mercenary intervention in the Seychelles in 1981, and supporting a coup in Lesotho in 1986. It was behind a coup attempt in Tanzania in 1983, provided support for rebels in Zimbabwe since independence, carried out raids against African National Congress offices in Maputo, Harare and Gaborone and conducted a counterinsurgency war in Namibia against SWAPO. SWAPO retreated to and operated from bases in Angola, and South Africa was confronted not only with the issue of having to cross another border in pursuit of SWAPO but also of another leftist government in the region. Unlike the other countries in the region, South Africa had no economic leverage on Angola, thus making military action the only possible means to exert any influence on the course of events.

On 14 July 1975, South African Prime Minister John Vorster approved weapons worth US$14 million to be bought secretly for FNLA and UNITA. First arms shipments for FNLA and UNITA from South Africa arrived in August 1975.

On 9 August 1975, a 30-man patrol of the South African Defence Force (SADF) moved some 50 km into southern Angola and occupied the Ruacana-Calueque hydro-electric complex and other installations on the Cunene River. Several hostile incidents with UNITA and SWAPO frightening foreign workers had been the pretext. The defence of the Calueque dam complex in southern Angola was South Africa's justification for the first permanent deployment of regular SADF units inside Angola.

On 22 August 1975, the SADF launched operation "Sausage II", a major raid against SWAPO in southern Angola. In addition, on 4 September 1975, Vorster authorized the provision of limited military training, advice and logistical support. In turn FNLA and UNITA would help the South Africans fighting SWAPO. Due to the recent MPLA's successes, UNITA's territory had been shrinking to parts of central Angola, and it became clear to South Africa that independence day would find the MPLA in control of Luanda; "neither the United States nor South Africa were willing to accept that." The SADF set up a training camp near Silva Porto and prepared the defences of Nova Lisboa (Huambo). They assembled the mobile attack unit "Foxbat" to stop approaching FAPLA-units with which it clashed on 5 October 1975, thus saving Nova Lisboa for UNITA.

On 14 October 1975, the South Africans secretly launched Operation Savannah when Task Force Zulu, the first of several South African columns, crossed from Namibia into Cuando Cubango. Southern Angola was in chaos with the three independence movements fighting each other for dominance. It took FAPLA some time, before it noticed who else it was up against and the SADF advanced very quickly. Task force Foxbat joined the intervention in mid-October. The operation provided for elimination of the MPLA from the southern border area, then from south western Angola, from the central region, and finally for the capture of Luanda.

According to Edward George, the South African government "believed that by invading Angola it could install its proxies and shore up apartheid for the foreseeable future". The United States had known of South Africa's military plans in advance. They encouraged the South Africans and co-operated with them, contrary to Secretary of State Henry Kissinger's testimony to Congress at the time, and in contrast to what President Ford told the Chinese, who supported the FNLA but were worried about South African engagement in Angola. According to John Stockwell, a former CIA officer, "there was close liaison between the CIA and the South Africans" and "'high officials' in Pretoria claimed that their intervention in Angola had been based on an 'understanding' with the United States".

=== Cuban military mission ===
On 3 August, a Cuban delegation traveled a second time to Angola to assess the situation, to draw up plans for the training programme as requested by Neto, and to hand over US$100,000. Neto had complained "of the little amount of aid from socialist countries" and "that the USSR detained aid to the MPLA in 1972, even though they told us that they are now helping with arms, but it's very little compared with their vast needs". Arguelles agreed with Neto as he saw the sides in Angola "clearly defined, that the FNLA and UNITA represented the international imperialist forces and the Portuguese reaction, and the MPLA represented the progressive and nationalist forces."

After the return of the delegation on 8 August, the Cubans considered the options of their instructors in Angola in case of an intervention by South Africa or Zaire which would be either "guerrilla war" or withdrawal to Zambia, where Cuba proceeded to open an embassy. In a memorandum of 11 August 1975, Major Raúl Diaz Argüelles to Major Raúl Castro explained the reasons for the visit and briefed on the contents of the talks. He underlined that the attacks on the part of the FNLA and of Mobutu to the MPLA and the possible development of future actions until independence in the month of November was taken into account and the awareness that "the reactionaries and the imperialists would try all possible methods to avoid having the forces of the MPLA take power". The same day Argüelles proposed a 94-man mission to Castro. On 15 August, Castro urged the USSR to increase support for the MPLA, offered to send special troops and asked for assistance. The Soviets declined.

In view of the Zairian intervention in the north and the South African occupation of Ruacana-Calueque hydro-electric complex in the south, it was decided to staff the CIRs with almost 500 Cubans instead of the requested 100, which were to form about 4,800 FAPLA recruits into 16 infantry battalions, 25 mortar batteries and various anti-aircraft units in three to six months. These 500 men included 17 in a medical brigade and 284 officers. "The decision to expand the operation reflected a feeling in Havana that ... there had to be enough of them to fulfil their mission as well as defend themselves in the event the operation went awry. It was nevertheless clear that ...they expected it (the mission) to be short term and to last around 6 months".

The dispatch of the Cuban volunteers started on 21 August. An advance party with the most urgently needed specialists used international commercial flights. Small groups continued to trickle into Luanda on such flights as well as on Cuba's aging Britannia planes and the bulk arrived after a two-week trip aboard three Cuban cargo vessels; the first one, the "Vietnam Heroico" docked at Porto Amboim on 5 October. The arrival of two Cuban ships in Angola with instructors on board was reported by the CIA and raised no alarm in Washington.

The CIRs were placed in Cabinda, Benguela, Saurimo (formerly Henrique de Carvalho) and at N'Dalatando (formerly Salazar). The CIR in Cabinda accounted for almost half of the total, 191 men, while the others had 66 or 67 each. Some were posted in headquarters in Luanda or in other places throughout the country. The reason for the stronger detachment in Cabinda was the perceived threat from Zaire either to Cabinda or to the Congo. By the time the training centres were fully staffed and operational on 18–20 October, unnoticed by the world, Operation Savannah was already in full swing.

In contrast to the successes in the south, where by mid-October the MPLA had gained control of 12 of Angola's provinces and most urban centres, they only barely managed to keep the well equipped FNLA and its allies abreast on the northern front just east of Luanda. The FNLA was receiving arms and equipment from the U.S. via Zaire starting in the end of July and had been strengthened in September by the arrival of the Fourth and Seventh Zairian Commando Battalions. From July to November the front moved back and forth between Caxito and Quifangondo (Kifangondo). Neto asked the Soviet Union for more support, but it had no intention to send any staff before independence and only reluctantly sent more arms. The Cubans were busy dealing with the arrival of the contingents for the CIRs and it was only on 19 October that they paid sufficient attention to Luanda's precarious position. Realizing the threat they shut down the CIR at Salazar only 3 days after it started operating and deployed most of the recruits and Cuban instructors in Luanda. Forty instructors from the CIR Salazar were the first Cubans to become involved in the defence of Quifangondo on 23 October 1975 when they launched an unsuccessful assault one FNLA-Zairian forces at Morro do Cal. A second group supported the MPLA on 28 October along the same defence line to the east of Kifangondo.

Yet unnoticed by the Cubans, the territory the MPLA had just gained in the south was quickly lost to the South African advances. After South African advisors and antitank weapons had helped to stop an MPLA advance on Nova Lisboa (Huambo) in early October, Zulu took Roçadas by 20 October, Sá da Bandeira by 24 October and Moçâmedes by 28 October. On 2–3 November, Cuban instructors for the third time got involved in the fighting, this time 51 men from the CIR Benguela, when they unsuccessfully tried to help the FAPLA stop the Zulu advance near Catengue. This first encounter between Cubans and South Africans also led to the first officially recognized Cuban fatalities. "Their participation led Zulu-Commander Breytenbach to conclude that his troops were 'facing the best organized and heaviest FAPLA opposition to date'".

== Cuba's first intervention ==
=== Operation Carlota ===
It was only after the MPLA debacle at Catengue that the Cubans became fully aware of the South African intervention, that Luanda would be taken and that their training missions were in grave danger unless they took immediate action. Neto had requested immediate and massive reinforcements from Havana at the urging of Argüelles. On 4 November, Castro decided to launch an intervention on an unprecedented scale, codenaming the mission Operation Carlota, after 'Black Carlota', the leader of a slave rebellion in 1843. The same day, a first plane with 100 heavy weapon specialists, which the MPLA had requested in September, left for Brazzaville, arriving in Luanda on 7 November. On 9 November the first two Cuban planes arrived in Luanda with the first 100 men of a contingent of a 652-strong battalion of elite Special Forces. The first priority of the Cubans was helping the MPLA to keep hold of Luanda. Fidel Castro explained the Cuban intervention: "When the invasion of Angola by regular South African troops started 23 October, we could not sit idle. And when the MPLA asked us for help, we offered the necessary aid to prevent Apartheid from making itself comfortable in Angola".

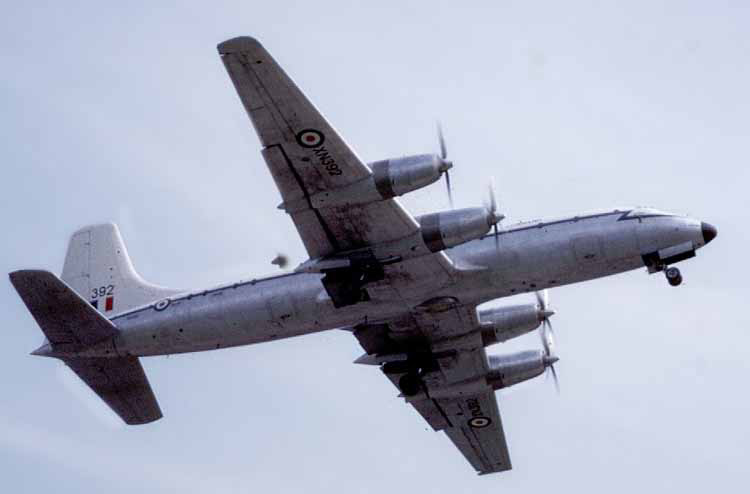
A Bristol Britannia, photographed in 1964.

With Operation Carlota, Cuba became a major player in the conflict. Unlike its foreign engagements in the sixties this was no secret operation. Castro decided to support the MPLA in all openness, sending special forces and 35,000 infantry by the end of 1976, deploying them at Cuba's own expense and with its own means from November 1975 to January 1976. As on its previous missions, all personnel were volunteers and the call-up was extremely popular.

Air transportation for quick deployments proved to be a major problem. Cuba only had three ageing medium-range Bristol Britannia turboprop planes not fit to make 9,000 km non-stop transatlantic crossings. Nevertheless, between 7 November and 9 December the Cubans managed to run 70 reinforcement flights to Luanda. Initially they were able to make stops in Barbados, the Azores, or Newfoundland, prompting pressure from Washington to deny Cuba landing rights. But moving take-offs to Cuba's easternmost airport, Holguin, taking as little weight as necessary, and adding additional tanks, the planes were used for numerous runs across the ocean until the Soviets pitched in with long-distance jet planes.

For the bulk of the troops and the equipment the Cubans commandeered all available ships in its merchant marine, the first three sailing from Havana on 8 November. They docked in Luanda on 27 and 29 November and 1 December bringing 1,253 troops and equipment.

The deployment of troops was not pre-arranged with the USSR, as often reported and depicted by the US administration. On the contrary, it also took the USSR by surprise. The Soviets were forced to accept the Cuban troop deployment so as not to endanger relations with their most important ally in close proximity to the United States. But they had in mind to keep a lid on the extent of the Cuban engagement and merely sent arms and a few specialists to Brazzaville and Dar es Salaam. It was only two months later after the fighting swung in favour of the Cubans and the U.S. passed the Clark Amendment that Moscow agreed to a degree of support by arranging for a maximum of 10 transport flights from Cuba to Angola.

With the FNLA attacking from the east, the situation for the MPLA only a few days before independence looked dim. In addition to this, Cabinda was under threat of takeover by a FLEC-Zairian force. The Cuban troops able to intervene before the declaration of independence on 11 November were the ones posted in the three CIRs, the 100 specialists that arrived in Luanda on 7 November and the first 164 special forces of Operation Carlota arriving on two planes on the evening of 8 November. The 100 specialists and 88 men of the special forces were immediately dispatched to the nearby front at Quifangondo where the FNLA-Zairian force had launched an assault that very morning. They supported 850 FAPLA, 200 Katangans and one Soviet advisor. The first heavy weapons had already arrived from Cuba by ship on 7 November, among them cannons, mortars and 6 BM-21 (Katyusha) multiple rocket launchers. The Cubans received reports that the expected invasion of Cabinda had started on the morning of 8 November.

=== Northern front and Cabinda ===
The invasion of Cabinda was conducted by three FLEC and one Zairian infantry battalions under the command of 150 French and American mercenaries. The MPLA's had the 232 Cubans of the CIR, a freshly trained and an untrained FAPLA infantry battalion at its disposal. In the ensuing battle for Cabinda from 8–13 November they managed to repel the invasion without support from Operation Carlota, thus saving the exclave for the MPLA.

Two days before independence, the most imminent danger for the MPLA came from the northern front where the FNLA and its allies stood east of Quifangondo. 2,000 FNLA troops were supported by two battalions of Zairian infantry troops (1,200 men), 120 Portuguese mercenaries, a few resident advisors, among them a small CIA contingent, and 52 South Africans led by General Ben de Wet Roos. They were manning the artillery provided by the SADF which had been flown into Ambriz only two days before.

After artillery bombardment on Luanda and Quifangondo through the night and a bombing raid by the South African air force in the early hours the final attack of the FNLA was launched on the morning of 10 November. The attacking force was ambushed and destroyed by the FAPLA-Cuban forces. Cuban forces also bombarded their South African and FNLA enemies with BM-21 Grad rocket launchers which had been put into place only the night before, and were well out of range of the antiquated South African guns. The defeat of the FNLA in the Battle of Quifangondo secured the capital for the MPLA. On the same day the Portuguese handed over power "to the people of Angola" and shortly after midnight Neto proclaimed independence and the formation of the "People's Republic of Angola". Urged by the CIA and other clandestine foreign services, the FNLA and UNITA announced the proclamation of a Democratic People's Republic with the temporary capital at Huambo. Yet, UNITA and FNLA could not agree on a united government and fighting between them already broke out in Huambo on the eve of independence day. On the day of independence the MPLA held little more than the capital and a strip of central Angola inland toward Zaire and the exclave of Cabinda. On 4 December the FAPLA-Cubans launched a counter-offensive against the FNLA. But with Luanda and Cabinda secured and the defeat of the FNLA at Quifangondo they could finally turn more attention to the south.

Cuba operated independently through December and January bringing in their troops in slowly, but steadily. Two months after the start of Operation Carlota the Soviets agreed to ten charter flights on long-range IL-62 jet airliners, starting on 8 January. This was followed one week later by an agreement that "the Soviets would supply all future weaponry ... transporting it directly to Angola so that the Cuban airlift could concentrate on personnel."

By early February, with increasing numbers in Cuban troops and sophisticated weaponry, the tide changed in favour of the MPLA. The final offensive in the North started on 1 January 1976. By 3 January, FAPLA-Cuban forces took the FNLA air bases of Negage and Camabatela and a day later the FNLA capital of Carmona. A last-ditch attempt by FNLA to use foreign mercenaries enlisted by the CIA (see next chapter: U.S. response) failed; on 11 January, FAPLA-Cubans captured Ambriz and Ambrizete (N'zeto) and on 15 February, the FNLA's last foothold, São Salvador. By late February, one Cuban and 12 FAPLA and battalions had completely annihilated the FNLA, driving what was left of them and the Zairian army across the border. The South African contingent on the northern front had already been evacuated by ship on 28 November. The last mercenaries left northern Angola by 17 January.

=== U.S. response ===
It was several days before the U.S. realised the severity of the FNLA defeat at Quifangondo, but even then had little idea of the extent of the Cuban involvement. The news from the southern front was, in their view, still positive. Kissinger, like the South Africans, was shaken by the scale of the Soviet and Cuban response. The CIA's Angolan task force at CIA headquarters at Langley had been so confident of success by the Zairian and South African regulars, that on 11 November the members had celebrated Angolan independence with wine and cheese in their offices. The U.S. had not commented on the South African intervention in Angola but denounced the Cuban intervention when it first acknowledged Cuban troops in Angola in an official statement on 24 November 1975. Kissinger said "that US efforts at rapprochement with Cuba would end should 'Cuban armed intervention in the affairs of other nations struggling to decide their own fate' continue." On 28 February 1976, Ford called Castro "an international outlaw" and the Cuban intervention a "flagrant act of aggression".

Due to the hostility between the U.S. and Cuba, the Americans regarded such an air by the Cubans as a defeat which could not be accepted. The U.S. assumed that the USSR was behind the Cuban interference. On 9 December Ford asked the Soviets to suspend the airlift, still assuming it was a Soviet-run operation. The Americans also depicted the motivations and timings of the Cubans differently: They claimed that South Africa had to intervene after Cuba sent troops in support of the MPLA and that the war in Angola was a major new challenge to US power by an expansionist Moscow newly confident following communist victories in the Vietnam War. Only years later did it become clear to them that the Cubans acted on their own behalf.

Castro responded to the U.S. reaction: "Why were they vexed? Why had they planned everything to take possession of Angola before 11 November? Angola is a country rich in resources. In Cabinda there is lots of oil. Some imperialists wonder why we help the Angolans, which interests we have. They are used to thinking that one country helps another one only when it wants its oil, copper, diamonds or other resources. No, we are not after material interests and it is logical that this is not understood by the imperialist. They only know chauvinistic, nationalistic and selfish criteria. By helping the people of Angola we are fulfilling a fundamental duty of Internationalism."

On 3 December 1975, in a meeting with officials from the U.S. and China including Deng Xiaoping (Vice Premier and deputy of Mao Zedong), Qiao Guanhua (Foreign Minister), President Gerald Ford, Henry Kissinger (Secretary of State/Foreign Minister), Brent Scowcroft (Assistant to the President for NSA) and George H. W. Bush (Chief of U.S. Liaison Office in Peking) international issues were discussed, one of them being Angola. Although China had supported the MPLA in the past, they now sided with the FNLA and UNITA. China was especially concerned about African sensitivities and pride and considered South African involvement as the primary and relatively complex problem. Kissinger responded, that the U.S. is prepared to "push out South Africa as soon as an alternative military force can be created". It is in this meeting that President Ford told the Chinese: "We had nothing to do with the South African involvement, and we will take action to get South Africa out, provided a balance can be maintained for their not being in". He also said that he had approved US$35 million more (in support of the north) above what had been done before. They discussed and agreed who should support the FNLA or UNITA by which means and in what manner taking into account the sensitivities of the neighbouring countries.

It was only when the U.S. administration asked Congress for US$28 million for IAFEATURE that Congress really paid attention to the events in Angola. By then "the evidence of the South African invasion was overwhelming and the stench of US-collusion with Pretoria hung in the air. Worse, the growing numbers of Cuban troops had derailed the CIA's plans and the administration seemed at a loss what to do next." The money was not approved and on 20 December 1975, the U.S. Senate passed an amendment banning covert assistance to anti-Communist forces and curtailing CIA involvement in Angola. Later that winter, an amendment to the foreign aid bill sponsored by Dick Clark extended the ban. (Clark Amendment) The U.S. administration resorted to other means of support for FNLA and UNITA of which one was raising mercenaries. The CIA initiated a covert programme to recruit Brazilians and Europeans to fight in the north of Angola. Altogether they managed to enlist around 250 men, but by the time meaningful numbers arrived in January 1975 the campaign in the north was all but over. Other ways of continued support for the FNLA and UNITA were through South Africa and other U.S. allied states such as Israel and Morocco.

A report by Henry Kissinger of 13 January 1976 gives an insight into the activities and hostilities in Angola, inter alia:

2. There follows an updated situation report based on classified sources.

A: Diplomatic

- (1) Two Cuban delegations were present in Addis Ababa. During the just concluded Organization of African Unity (OAU) meeting, one delegation, headed by Osmany Cienfuegos, PCC ? Official concerned with Africa and Middle East and member of the PCC Central Committee, visited the Congo, Nigeria, Uganda and Algeria prior to the OAU meeting. Another Cuban delegation was headed by Cuba's ambassador Ricardo Alarcon.
- (2) In late December early January a MPLA delegation visited Jamaica, Guyana, Venezuela and Panama to obtain support for its cause. The delegation is still in the region.

B: Military

- (1) It is estimated that Cuba may now have as many as 9,000 troops in Angola, based on the number of Cuban airlifts and sealifts which have presently transited Angola. Military assistance to the MPLA may have cost Cuba the equivalent of US$30 million. This figure includes the value of the military equipment that Cuba has sent to Angola, the costs of transporting men and material, and the cost of maintaining troops in the field.
- (2) Cuban troops bore the brunt of fighting in the MPLA offensive in the northern sector last week which resulted in MPLA capture of Uige (Carmona). The MPLA may be preparing for an offensive in the south, partially at the request of the South West Africa People's Organization (SWAPO).
- (3) Eight Soviet fighters, probably MiG-17s, are reported being assembled in Luanda. These fighters arrived from an unknown source at the end of December. Eight MiGs, type unknown, are expected to be sent to Angola from Nigeria, numerous Cuban pilots arrived during December. The pilots are operating many aircraft now available to the MPLA including a Fokker Friendship F-27. The Cubans will operate the MiGs.
- (4) Cuban troops are in complete control of Luanda by January 9. They are conducting all security patrols, operating police checkpoints, and will apparently soon assume control of Luanda's airport complex.
- (5) Cuba may have begun to use 200 passenger capacity IL-62 aircraft (Soviet) in its airlift support operations. The IL-62 has double the capacity of Bristol Britannias and IL-18 which Cuba has previously employed and has a longer range as well. IL-62 left Havana for Luanda Jan. 10. and Jan. 11.

C: Other:

- All Portuguese commercial flights now landing at Luanda carry as cargo as much food as possible. Food supplies available to the general population have become tight.

"US intelligence estimated that by December 20 there were 5,000 to 6,000 Cubans in Angola." "Cuban sources, however, indicate that the number hovered around 3,500 to 4,000." This more or less would have put the Cubans at par with the South Africans on the southern front. Gabriel García Márquez wrote that Kissinger remarked to Venezuelan President Carlos Andrés Pérez: 'Our intelligence services have grown so bad that we only found out that Cubans were being sent to Angola after they were already there.' At that moment, there were many Cuban troops, military specialists and civilian technicians in Angola — more even than Kissinger imagined. Indeed, there were so many ships anchored in the bay of Luanda that by February 1976 Neto said to a functionary close to him: 'It's not right', if they go on like that, the Cubans will ruin themselves.' It is unlikely that even the Cubans had foreseen that their intervention would reach such proportions. It had been clear to them right from the start, however, that the action had to be swift, decisive, and at all costs successful. But one result of the events in Angola in 1976 was the American's heightened attention to African affairs, especially in the south of the continent. Kissinger worried, "if the Cubans are involved there, Namibia is next and after that South Africa itself." With the need to distance themselves from outcasts in the eyes of black Africa this also meant the U.S. would drop support for the white regime in Rhodesia, a price it was willing to pay to "thwart communism".

=== International press coverage ===
The South Africans had managed to keep their intervention hidden from world view for quite some time. It even took the MPLA until 23 October 1975 to notice that not white mercenaries but the SADF was advancing on Luanda. Yet it took another whole month for the world press to take notice: A day after the South African coastal advance was stopped, two correspondents from Reuters and British Independent Television News published news that South Africans were fighting in Angola. On 23 November 1975 a major Western newspaper, the Washington Post, announced that regular South African troops were fighting inside Angola. Although other papers were still slow to follow, e.g., the New York Times on 12 December, the fact eventually became internationally known. The South African public had also been kept in the dark, and only on 19 December learned more about what was called the "Border War" when papers published pictures of SADF soldiers captured by FAPLA and the Cubans.

=== Southern front ===
==== SADF advance is stopped ====
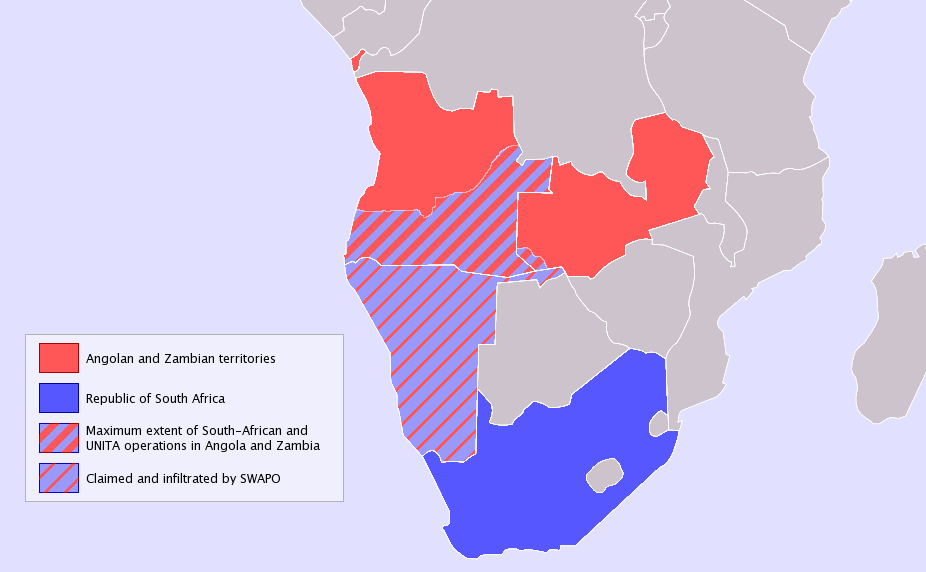
Scope of SADF-operations.

By the time FAPLA and the Cubans were able to turn more attention to the southern front after the battle of Quifangondo, the South Africans had gained considerable ground. On 6 and 7 November 1975, Task Force Zulu took the harbour cities of Benguela and Lobito which had been unexpectedly abandoned. The towns and cities taken by the SADF were handed over to UNITA. In central Angola, at the same time, combat unit Foxbat had moved 800 km north toward Luanda. By then it became clear that Luanda could not be taken by independence day on 11 November and the South Africans considered to break off the advance and retreat. But on 10 November 1975 Vorster gave in to UNITA's urgent request to keep up the military pressure with the aim of capturing as much territory as possible before the upcoming meeting of the OAU. Thus, Zulu and Foxbat continued north with two new battle groups formed further inland (X-Ray and Orange) and "there was little reason to think the FAPLA would be able to stop this expanded force from capturing Luanda within a week." Through November and December 1975, the SADF presence in Angola numbered 2,900 to 3,000 personnel.

Zulu now faced stronger resistance advancing on Novo Redondo after which fortunes changed in favour of the FAPLA and the Cubans. The first Cuban reinforcements arrived in Porto Amboim, only a few km north of Novo Redondo, quickly destroying three bridges crossing the Queve river, effectively stopping the South African advance along the coast on 13 November 1975. Despite concerted efforts to advance north to Novo Redondo, the SADF was unable to break through FAPLA defences. In a last successful advance a South African task force and UNITA troops took Luso on the Benguela railway on 11 December which they held until 27 December.

By mid-December, South Africa extended military service and called in reserves. "An indication of the seriousness of the situation …. is that one of the most extensive military call-ups in South African history is now taking place". By late December, Cuba had deployed 3,500 to 4,000 troops in Angola, of which 1,000 were securing Cabinda and eventually the tide turned in favour of the MPLA. Apart from being "bogged down" on the southern front, South Africa had to deal with two other major setbacks: the international press taking note of the operation and the shift in U.S. policies.

==== South Africa withdraws ====
In light of these developments, Pretoria had to decide whether it would stay in the game and bring in more troops. In late December 1975, there were heated debates between Vorster, foreign minister Muller, defence minister Botha, head of BOSS (South African Bureau of State Security) van den Bergh and a number of senior officials as to withdraw or to stay. Zaire, UNITA and the U.S. urged South Africa to stay. But the U.S. would not openly endorse the South African intervention and assure continuing military assistance in case of an escalation.

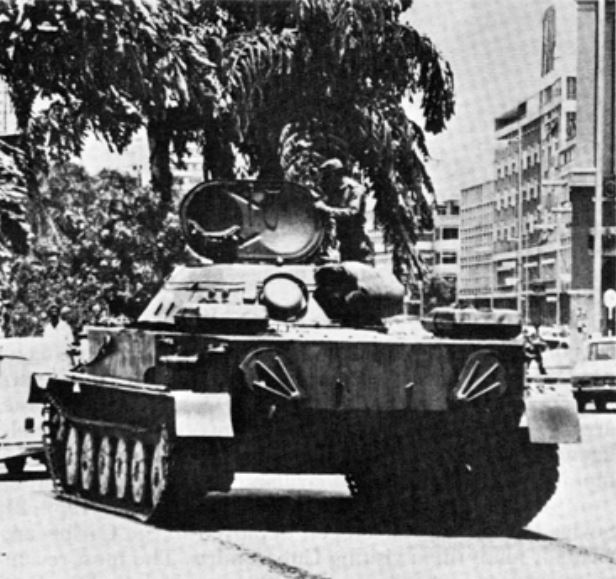
Cuban-manned PT-76 tank in the streets of Luanda, 1976.

On 30 December 1975, Vorster planned to withdraw after the OAU emergency session in Addis Ababa on 13 January 1976, to a line 50 to 80 km north of the Namibian border. "In military terms the advance had come to a halt anyway, as all attempts by Battle-Groups Orange and X-Ray to extend the war into the interior had been forced to turn back by destroyed bridges."

In early January 1976, the Cubans launched a first counter-offensive driving Foxbat from the Tongo and Medunda hills. The OAU meeting which the South Africans had hopes for finally debated the Angola issue and voted on 23 January 1976, condemning the South African intervention and demanding its withdrawal. Sobered by the Cubans' performance and by the West's cold shoulder, Pretoria chose to fold and ordered the retreat of its troops from Angola.

The sentiment of the Pretoria government at the time was expressed in a speech by Botha before South African parliament on 17 April 1978, in which he charged the U.S. with "defaulting on a promise to give them all necessary support in their campaign to defeat the MPLA": "Against which neighbouring states have we taken aggressive steps? I know of only one occasion in recent years, when we crossed a border and that was in the case of Angola when we did so with the approval and knowledge of the Americans. But they left us in the lurch. We are going to retell that story: the story must be told and how we, with their knowledge, went in there and operated in Angola with their knowledge, how they encouraged us to act and, when we had nearly reached the climax, we were ruthlessly left in the lurch".

Once the decision was made, South Africa rapidly withdrew its forces towards Namibia. In late January, the SADF abandoned the towns of Cela and Novo Redondo Apart from a few skirmishes, the Cubans stayed well behind the retreating South Africans and easily overcame the remaining UNITA resistance. By early February 1976, the SADF had retreated to the far south of Angola, leaving behind mine fields and blown up bridges. UNITA's capital, Nova Lisboa (Huambo) fell into FAPLA hands on 8 February, the ports of Lobito and Benguela on 10 February. By 14 February, control of the Benguala railway was complete and on 13 March UNITA lost its last foothold in far south-eastern Angola, Gago Gouthinho (Lumbala N'Guimbo). It is in this attack that the Cubans for the first time employed their airforce.

Four to five thousand SADF troops kept a strip along the Namibian border up to 80 km deep until Angola at least gave assurance that it wouldn't supply bases for SWAPO and that it would continue to supply electricity to Namibia from the Cunene dams. While the Cubans and FAPLA were slowly approaching the southern border, South Africa and the MPLA took up indirect negotiations about South African withdrawal brokered by the British and Soviet governments. Neto ordered FAPLA and the Cubans to halt at a distance to the border, forestalling what some feared might turn into a much bigger conflict. In exchange for South African recognition, he offered to guarantee the safety of South Africa's 180 million US$ investment in the Cunene hydroelectric complex in northwest Namibia, close to the Angolan border. On 25 March, Botha announced the total withdrawal of South African troops from Angola by 27 March 1976. On 27 March, the last 60 military vehicles crossed the border into Namibia.

=== Consolidation ===
With the withdrawal of South Africa, FNLA and UNITA resistance crumbled and the MPLA was left in sole possession of power. With the help of its Cuban allies the MPLA "not only vanquished its bitterest rivals – the FNLA and UNITA – but in the process had seen off the CIA and humbled the mighty Pretoria war machine." Whatever remained of UNITA retreated into the Angolan bush and Zaire. A number of African countries publicly discredited UNITA for its links with the apartheid government, the CIA and white mercenaries.

The United Nations Security Council met to consider "the act of aggression committed by South Africa against the People's Republic of Angola" and on 31 March 1976, branded South Africa the aggressor, demanding it provide compensation for war damages. Internationally South Africa found itself completely isolated and the failure of its Operation Savannah left it "without a single crumb of comfort". "The internal repercussions of the Angolan debacle were felt quickly when, on 16 June 1976 – emboldened by the FAPLA-Cuban victory – the Soweto Uprising began, inaugurating a period of civil unrest which was to continue up until and beyond the collapse of apartheid." Another setback for Pretoria within four years was the end of white minority rule in Rhodesia as it emerged as the next black majority-ruled nation of Zimbabwe, completing the total geographic isolation of apartheid South Africa. Angola obtained recognition by the OAU on 10 February 1976. The OAU recognized the MPLA as Angola's government. The majority of the international community albeit not the U.S. soon did the same. The U.S. was unable to prevent its admittance to the UN General Assembly as its 146th member.

At the height of the deployment in 1976, Cuba had 36,000 military personnel stationed in Angola. At their meeting in Conakry on 14 March 1976, when victory was already assured, Castro and Neto decided that the Cubans would withdraw gradually, leaving behind for as long as necessary enough men to organize a strong, modern army, capable of guaranteeing the MPLA's future security without outside help. The Cubans had no intention of getting bogged down in a lengthy internal counter-insurgency and started to reduce their presence in Angola as planned after the retreat of the South Africans. By the end of May, more than 3,000 troops had already returned to Cuba, and many more were on the way. By the end of the year the Cuban troops had been reduced to 12,000.

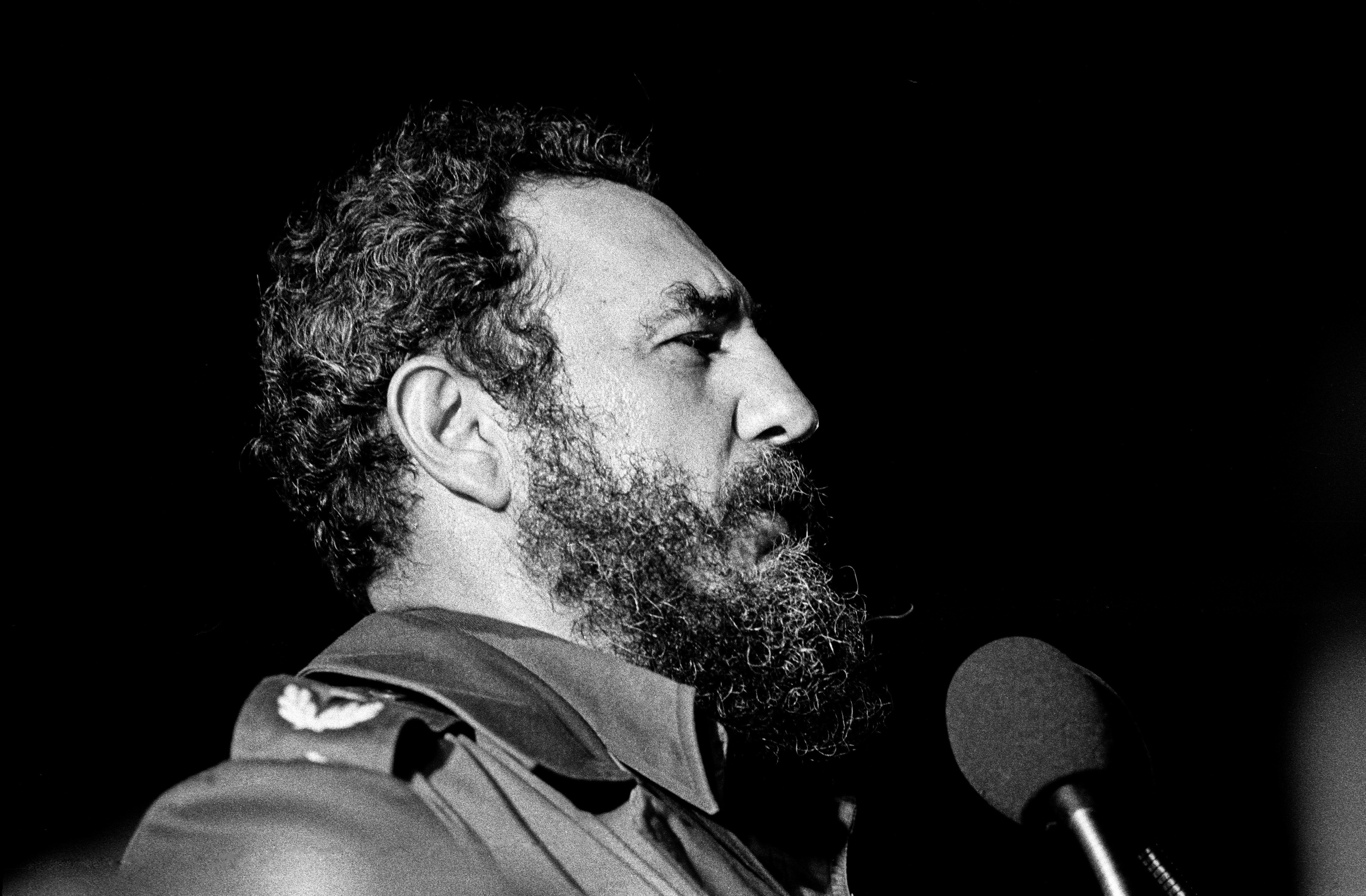
Fidel Castro 1978 speaking in Havana, Photo: Marcelo Montecino.

The Cubans had high hopes that after their victory in Angola, in co-operation with the USSR, they could remove all of southern Africa from the influence of the U.S. and China. In Angola, they put up dozens of training camps for Namibian (SWAPO), Rhodesian (ZAPU) and South African (ANC) guerrillas. An SADF intelligence report in 1977 concluded "that SWAPO's standard of training had improved significantly because of the training they had received from the Cuban instructors". Cuba saw its second main task in training and equipping the FAPLA which the Soviets generously supplied with sophisticated weapons including tanks and an own air force with MiG-21 fighters.

In early 1977, the new Carter administration had in mind to recognize the MPLA-government despite the presence of Cuban troops assuming they would be withdrawn once the Namibian issue was settled and the southern border of Angola was secure. The MPLA and Cuban troops had control over all southern cities by 1977, but roads in the south faced repeated UNITA attacks. Savimbi expressed his willingness for rapprochement with the MPLA and the formation of a unity, socialist government, but he insisted on Cuban withdrawal first. "The real enemy is Cuban colonialism," Savimbi told reporters, warning, "The Cubans have taken over the country, but sooner or later they will suffer their own Vietnam in Angola."

On the international stage, Cuba's victory against South Africa boosted Castro's image as one of the top leaders in the Non-Aligned Movement of which he was secretary-general from 1979 to 1983. Although with Cuba's help the MPLA-government became firmly established, Cuban attempts to hand over the defence of the country failed and it soon became drawn into MPLA's war against UNITA.

=== Humanitarian engagement ===
According to the Cubans, the overriding priority of their mission in Angola was humanitarian, not military. In the wake of Operation Carlota, around 5,000 Cuban technical, medical and educational staff were constantly posted in Angola to fill the gaps the Portuguese had left behind. "For a generation of Cubans, internationalist service in Angola represented the highest ideal of the Cuban Revolution" and for many it became a normal part of life to volunteer for an internationalist mission, principally in Angola, which lasted 18 to 24 months. In the following years, tens of thousands of volunteers were processed each year. By 1978, Angola's health system was almost completely run by Cuban doctors. After the Portuguese left the country, there was only one doctor per 100,000 inhabitants. The Cubans posted a large medical team at Luanda's University and Prenda hospitals and opened clinics in remote areas all across Angola.

At the time of independence, over 90% of the Angolan population was illiterate. Starting in June 1977, an educational programme began to take shape. 2,000 students were granted scholarships in Cuba and by 1987 there were 4,000 Angolan students studying on the "Isla de la Juventud" (Isle of Youth). In March 1978, the first Cuban 732-strong secondary school teacher brigade (Destacamento Pedagógico Internacionalista) took up its work in Angola. These were later joined by 500 primary school teachers and 60 professors at Luanda's university. Through the 1980s the level was constantly held at about 2,000 teachers of all levels.

The technical programme was the largest branch of Cuba's humanitarian mission as Angola was desperate for technicians to oversee the reconstruction projects. Cuban engineers, technicians and construction workers worked on construction sites, especially repairing the badly damaged infrastructure (bridges, roads, buildings, telecommunication etc.) of the country. The first teams arrived in January 1977 and in the following 5 years they built 2,000 houses in Luanda and 50 new bridges, reopened several thousand km of road, electricity and telephone networks. Attempts to revive Angolan coffee and sugar cane production soon failed due to the spread of war with UNITA. According to Cubatecnica, the government office for non-military foreign assistance, there were more Cuban volunteers than could be accepted and long waiting lists. Cuba's engagement laid the foundations for Angola's social services.

=== Economic subsidies ===
During the intervention, the MPLA-government used the profits from the Angola's oil industry to subsidize Cuba's economy, making Cuba as economically dependent upon Angola as the MPLA-government was militarily dependent upon Cuba. The low oil prices of the 1980s changed the MPLA-government's attitude about subsidizing the Cuban economy. President Eduardo dos Santos found the promises of subsidies made in the 1970s when oil prices were high to be a serious drain upon Angola's economy in the 1980s, leading him to become less generous in subsidizing the Cuban economy during the latter part of Cuba's intervention. The cost of the intervention was also paid for with Soviet subsidies at a time when the Soviet economy was also badly affected by low oil prices.

== Proxy war, UN resolutions and negotiations (late 1970s and 1980s) ==
In the following years, Cuba kept itself engaged in a number of other African countries. In 1978, Cuba sent 16,000 troops to the Ethiopian Ogaden War, but this time in close coordination with the Soviets. Smaller military missions were active in the People's Republic of the Congo, Guinea, Guinea-Bissau, Mozambique and Benin. Cuban technical, educational and medical staff in the tens of thousands were working in even more countries: Algeria (Tindouf), Mozambique, Cape Verde, Guinea-Bissau, Guinea, Ethiopia, São Tomé and Príncipe, Tanzania, the Congo and Benin. Up to 18,000 students from these countries studied on full Cuban scholarships per year on the island.

Towards the end of the 1970s and into the 1980s, Angola slipped away from wider international public attention but despite Cuba's victory on the ground, the war in Angola was far from over. UNITA was able to take up its insurgency operations in the south with the help of military and logistical support from South Africa and the MPLA still had not gained control over the whole country. While the vast majority of the Cuban troops remaining in Angola stayed in the bases, some of them helped in 'mopping-up' operations, clearing remaining pockets of resistance in Cabinda and in the north. The operations in the south were less successful because of "Savimbi's tenacity and determination to fight on". "Most of the Cubans were organized and deployed in motorized infantry, air defense, and artillery units. Their main missions were to deter and defend against attacks beyond the southern combat zone, protecting strategic and economically critical sites and facilities, and provide combat support, such as rear-area security for major military installations and Luanda itself. At least 2000 Cuban troops were stationed in oil-producing Cabinda Province".

After the South African retreat SWAPO again established bases in southern Angola, now supported by the MPLA, and stepped up its operations in Namibia. In turn, as of early 1977, South African incursions into Angola were on the increase.

Cuban forces soon again were increased due to tensions between the MPLA and Zaire in March 1977 (see Shaba I). Mobutu accused the MPLA of instigating and supporting an attack of the Front for the National Liberation of the Congo (FNLC) on the Zairian province of Shaba and Neto charged Mobutu with harbouring and supporting the FNLA and FLEC. Two months later the Cubans played a role in stabilizing the Neto government and foiling the Nitista Plot when Nito Alves and José Jacinto Van-Dúnem split from the government and led an uprising. While Cuban soldiers actively helped Neto put down the coup, Alves and Neto both believed the Soviet Union supported Neto's ouster, which is another indication of the mutual distrust between the Soviets and Neto as well as the differing interests between the Soviets and the Cubans. Raúl Castro sent an additional four thousand troops to prevent further dissension within the MPLA's ranks and met with Neto in August in a display of solidarity. In contrast, Neto's distrust in the Soviet leadership increased and relations with the USSR worsened. Thousands of people were estimated to have been killed by Cuban and MPLA troops in the aftermath of Nito's attempted coup over a period that lasted up to two years, with some estimates claiming as high as 70,000 murdered. Amnesty International estimated 30,000 died in the purge.

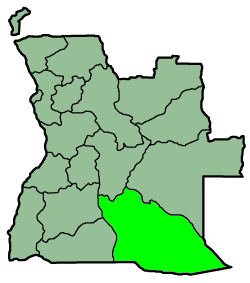
Angola's Cuando Cubango province

In 1977 Britain, Canada, France, the Federal Republic of Germany (West Germany), and the United States formed an informal negotiating team, called the "Contact Group", to work with South Africa to implement a UN plan for free elections in Namibia. The South African government, however, was fundamentally opposed to the UN plan, which it claimed was biased in favour of the installation of a SWAPO government in Namibia.

South Africa continued to support UNITA, which not only took up the fight against the MPLA but also helped the South Africans hunt down SWAPO, denying it a safe zone along Angola's southern border. The SADF established bases in Cuando Cubango Province in south-eastern Angola and the South African Air Force (SAAF) supplied UNITA with air cover from bases in Namibia. South Africa also went to great lengths to brush up Savimbi's image abroad, especially in the US. Apart from being a friend to some African dictators Savimbi became the toast of the Reagan White House and was feted by the rightwing establishment in many countries. Beginning in 1978, periodic South African incursions and UNITA's northward expansion in the east forced the MPLA to increase expenditures on Soviet military aid and to depend even more on military personnel from the USSR, East Germany and Cuba.

The first large-scale incursions by the SADF occurred in May 1978 (Operation Reindeer), which became South Africa's most controversial operation in Angola. It involved two simultaneous assaults on a heavily populated SWAPO camps at Cassinga (Kassinga) and Chetequera. SADF intelligence believed Cassinga to be a PLAN (People's Liberation Army of Namibia, the armed wing of SWAPO) camp. The operational order was "to inflict maximum losses", but where possible, to "capture leaders". In the air borne raid on 4 May 1978 (SADF-terminology: Battle of Cassinga) over 600 people were killed, including some women and children. The raid was condemned by the UN Security Council two days later, on 6 May. In addition, up to 150 Cubans of a unit rushing to the camp's aid lost their lives in an air attack and ambush on the way from their garrison in Tchamutete 15 km to the south. Thus, Cuba suffered its highest single-day casualty of its Angolan intervention. According to the controversial findings of the Truth and Reconciliation Commission, the camp most likely served civilian as well as a military purposes and the raid constituted a breach of international law and the "commission of gross human rights violations". SWAPO and the international media branded the incident a massacre turning it into a political disaster for South Africa. The revulsion at the carnage of the "Cassinga raid" and the ensuing international outcry led to the adoption of UN Security Council Resolution 435 on 29 September 1978, calling for Namibia's independence and, to that end, for the establishment of a "Transition Assistance Group". Pretoria signed the resolution which spelled out the steps for granting independence to Namibia, and according to Bender, raised expectations that peace was in sight in southern Africa.

In Resolution 447 of 28 March 1979, the UN Security Council concluded "that the intensity and timing of these acts of armed invasion are intended to frustrate attempts at negotiated settlements in southern Africa" and voiced concern "about the damage and wanton destruction of property caused by the South African armed invasions of Angola launched from Namibia, a territory which South Africa illegally occupies". It strongly condemned "the racist regime of South Africa for its premeditated, persistent and sustained armed invasions ... of Angola", its "utilization of the international territory of Namibia as a springboard for armed invasions and destabilization of ... Angola" and demanded that "South Africa cease immediately its provocative armed invasions against ...Angola". On 2 November 1979 the UN Security Council passed yet another resolution (454), branding South Africa in a similar fashion for its armed incursions, calling upon South Africa "to cease immediately all acts of aggression and provocation against ... Angola" and "forthwith to withdraw all its armed forces from Angola" and demanding that "South Africa scrupulously respect the independence, sovereignty and territorial integrity ... of Angola" and that "South Africa desist forthwith from the utilization of Namibia, a territory which it illegally occupies, to launch acts of aggression against ... Angola or other neighbouring African States". Nevertheless, by the end of 1979, following the bombing of Lubango, an undeclared war was in full swing.

Hardly 2 weeks later, on 17 May 1978, 6,500 Katangese gendarmes invaded the Zairian province of Shaba from bases in eastern Angola and the U.S. accused Cuba of having a hand in it. Although there is no proof for a Cuban involvement it is likely that the Katangese had the support of the MPLA. They were driven back across the border by French and Belgian military and Cuba and the U.S. coaxed Neto and Mobutu to sign a non-aggression pact. While Neto agreed to repatriate the Katangese Mobutu cut off aid to FNLA, FLEC and UNITA and their bases along the border were shut down. By late 1978 the MPLA's security had been steadily deteriorating and UNITA emerging as a formidable guerrilla army, expanding its operations from Cuando Cubango into Moxico and Bié while the SADF intensified its cross-border campaigns from Namibia. Neto died on 10 September 1979 while seeking medical treatment in Moscow and was succeeded by José Eduardo Dos Santos.

In elections held in February 1980; the leader of the leftist Zimbabwe African National Union (ZANU) and outspoken opponent of apartheid, Robert Mugabe, was elected president, ending white minority rule in Zimbabwe. Losing its last ally (Rhodesia) in the region, South Africa adopted the policy of "Total Onslaught" vowing "to strike back at any neighbouring states which harboured anti-apartheid forces". On 10 June 1980 Pretoria launched its largest operation since World War II, 180 km into Angola, during which, for the first time, it was attacked by the FAPLA. In the following September, the SADF assisted UNITA in the capture of Mavinga.

In the early 1980s, the United States, in their endeavour to get the USSR and Cuba out of Angola, became directly involved in negotiations with the MPLA. The MPLA argued it could safely reduce the number of Cuban troops and Soviet advisors if it wasn't for the continuing South African incursions and threat at its southern border. The most obvious solution was an independent Namibia which South Africa had to give up. After having to accept a leftist regime in Angola, Pretoria was reluctant to relinquish control of Namibia because of the possibility that the first elections would bring its "traditional nemesis", SWAPO, to power. It continued to attend negotiating sessions of the Contact Group throughout the early 1980s, always prepared to bargain but never ready to settle. Cuba, not involved in the negotiations, basically agreed to such a solution paving the way to Namibia's independence. Yet, towards the end of Reagan's second term in office, the negotiations had not born any fruit.

After the UN-sponsored talks on the future of Namibia failed in January 1981, (South Africa walked out of the Pre-Implementation Conference in Geneva on 13 January) in April 1981 the new American Assistant Secretary of State for African Affairs, Chester Crocker, took up negotiations combining 'constructive engagement with South Africa' with the 'linkage' proposal (independence for Namibia in change for Cuba's withdrawal). Both the MPLA and South Africa deeply distrusted the U.S. for various reasons and the idea was rejected. It continued to be the basis of further negotiations; yet, the Contact Group members as well as the 'frontline states' (states bordering South Africa) were opposed to linking Namibian independence with Cuban withdrawal. Despite its overwhelming presence in Angola, the Cubans remained uninvited to the negotiations.

The same year, South African military activity increased against MPLA targets and SWAPO guerrillas. On 23 August 1981, the SADF launched Operation Protea with eleven thousand troops penetrating 120 kilometres into southwestern Angola and occupying about 40,000 km^{2} in southern Cunene (holding the territory until 1988). Bases were established in Xangongo and N'Giva. The South Africans not only fought SWAPO but also wanted FAPLA out of the border area and openly intensified assaults on Angolan economic targets. The U.S. vetoed a UN Resolution condemning the operation, instead insisting on Cuba's withdrawal from Angola. Within five months of the South African intervention the Soviets started a new two-year military programme for the FAPLA to which Cuba committed another 7,000 troops. FAPLA-Cuban forces refrained from larger actions against South African operations, which were routinely undertaken deep into MPLA territory following Operation Protea. Through 1982 and 1983 the SAAF also participated in operations by UNITA, which gained more and more control of south-eastern Angola. The attacks by far exceeded the previous hit-and-run and were aimed primarily at the Benguela Railway. Increasingly Cubans got involved in the fighting, either because they had garrisons in the embattled area or because they came to the rescue of FAPLA units under attack. The civil war had a crippling effect on the Angolan economy, especially agriculture and infrastructure, creating hundreds of thousands of refugees. UNITA guerrillas took foreign technicians hostage.

On 6 December 1983, Pretoria launched its twelfth incursion, Operation Askari, in pursuit of SWAPO which also to inflict as much damage as possible on FAPLA's increasing military presence in southern Angola. In protest, France and shortly after Canada, left the UN Contact Group. On 20 December the UN Security Council passed yet another resolution (546) demanding withdrawal and reparations by South Africa. Unlike during Operation Protea this operation was met with strong resistance by the FAPLA-Cuban forces leading to the fiercest fighting since independence. A battle ensued after a SADF attack on a SWAPO camp near Cuvelei (northern Cunene) on 3 – 7 January 1984. Although SWAPO suffered a severe defeat in this campaign the South Africans were unable to unseat the FAPLA from bases at Cahama, Mulondo and Caiundo as it had planned. Under growing international pressure Pretoria stopped the operation and retreated south of the border on 15 January but kept the garrisons in Calueque, N'Giva and Xangongo. A cease fire between the MPLA and South Africa was signed on 31 January, the first treaty between Luanda and Pretoria. Peace negotiations resumed and in February 1984 Crocker met with the MPLA and South Africans in Lusaka, Zambia. The resulting first 'Lusaka Accord' of 16 February 1984 detailed the disengagement of MPLA and South African forces in southern Angola. Already during this process the accord was doomed to fail because SWAPO was not involved in the talks and continued its operations. UNITA also stepped up its raids including mine-laying, truck bombs, hostage taking and attacking foreign civilians as far north as Sumbe.

In a joint statement on 19 March 1984 Cuba and the MPLA announced the principles on which a Cuban withdrawal would be negotiated: unilateral withdrawal of the SADF, implementation of Resolution 435 and cessation of support for UNITA and armed actions in Angola. Cuban withdrawal would be a matter between Cuba and Angola. In a similar joint announcement in 1982 these principles had been formulated as demands. The proposal was rejected by Botha. In September 1984 the MPLA presented a plan calling for the retreat of all Cubans to positions north of the 13th parallel and then to the 16th parallel, again on the condition that South Africa pulled out of Namibia and respected Resolution 435. 10.000 Cuban troops around the capital and in Cabinda were to remain. A major obstacle in the negotiations was the timeline for the withdrawal of Cuban troops. While Pretoria demanded a maximum of 7 months the Cubans wanted four years. Crocker managed to reduce the Cuban's timeline to two years upon which the South Africans suggested only 12 weeks. Crocker then proposed a timeline of 2 years and a withdrawal in stages and a maximum of 6,000 troops remaining up to another year in the north. But both parties and UNITA rejected this proposal and the negotiations stalled. On 17 April Pretoria installed an 'Interim Government' in Namibia which was in direct contravention of Resolution 435. The Lusaka Accord completely fell apart when South Africa broke the cease-fire. On 20 May 1985 it sent a commando team to blow up an American-run Gulf Oil facility in northern Angola. The raid failed, but it showed that Pretoria was "not interested in a cease-fire agreement or the Namibian settlement to which a cease-fire was supposed to lead."

On 10 July 1985 the U.S. Congress rescinded the 10-year-old Clark Amendment. Within a year at least seven bills and resolutions followed urging aid to UNITA, including overt military support and some US$15 million. From 1986 the U.S. openly supported UNITA. By 1986 the war reached a stalemate: FAPLA was unable to uproot UNITA in its tribal stronghold and UNITA was no serious threat to the government in Luanda. Within a week Pretoria, suffering from internal unrest and international sanctions, declared a State of Emergency.

In 1985, UNITA claimed they had been targeted with chemical weapons, specifically organophosphates. The following year, UNITA reported being attacked three times with an unidentified greenish-yellow agent on three separate occasions resulting in victims suffering blindness or death. UNITA also claimed they were attacked by a brown agent which resembled mustard gas. In 1988, United Nations toxicologists certified that residue from both VX and sarin nerve agents had been discovered in plants, water, and soil where Cuban units were conducting operations against UNITA.

== Cuba's second intervention ==
=== Escalation of the conflict ===
As a result of the South African Operation Askari in December 1983, which targeted People's Liberation Army of Namibia bases inside Angola, the USSR not only increased its aid to the MPLA but also took over the tactical and strategic leadership of FAPLA, deploying advisors right down to the battalion level, and began planning a large-scale offensive against the UNITA-stronghold in southeastern Angola.

Soviet command did not include the Cuban forces in Angola. Cuba's strategic opinions differed considerably from those of the Soviets and MPLA and Cuba strongly advised against an offensive in the southeast because it would create the opportunity for a significant South African intervention, which is what transpired. A FAPLA-offensive in 1984 had already brought dismal results. Under Soviet leadership the FAPLA launched two more offensives in 1985 and 1986. The Cubans deny involvement in the 1985 operation but supported the offensive in 1986 despite many reservations, not providing ground forces but technical and air support. Apart from taking Cazombo in 1985, coming close to Mavinga and bringing UNITA close to defeat, both offensives ended in a complete failure and became a major embarrassment for the Soviets. Unlike the Cubans with ten years of experience in the African theatre, the Soviet leadership was inexperienced and relations between the two became strained. In addition, in March 1985 Mikhail Gorbachev had become the new General Secretary with whom Castro had considerable disagreements. In both FAPLA-offensives South Africa, still controlling the lower reaches of southwestern Angola, intervened as soon as UNITA came into distress. In September 1985, the South African Air Force prevented the fall of Mavinga and the FAPLA-offensive ended at the Lomba River.

After this debacle in 1985, the Soviets sent more equipment and advisors to Angola and immediately went about preparing another FAPLA-offensive in the following year. In the meantime UNITA received its first military aid from the U.S., which included surface-to-air Stinger missiles and BGM-71 TOW anti-tank-missiles. The U.S. sent supplies to UNITA and SADF through the reactivated Kamina Airbase in Zaire. The offensive starting in May 1986 already got off to a poor start and again with the help of the SADF UNITA managed to stop the advance by late August.

=== Cuito Cuanavale ===
Preparations went on their way for the next offensive in 1987, Operação Saludando Octubre, and once more the Soviets upgraded the FAPLA's equipment including 150 T-55 and T-54B tanks and Mi-24 and Mi-8/Mi-17 helicopters. Again they dismissed warnings of a South African intervention. Pretoria, taking notice of the massive military build-up around Cuito Cuanavale, warned UNITA and on 15 June authorized covert support. In spite of these preparations, on 27 July Castro proposed Cuba's participation in the negotiations, indicating that he was interested in curtailing its involvement in Angola. The Reagan administration declined.

From the very start of the FAPLA-offensive it was clear to Pretoria that UNITA could not withstand the onslaught and on 4 August 1987 launched clandestine Operation Moduler, which engaged in the first fights nine days later. The FAPLA reached the northern banks of the Lomba River near Mavinga on 28 August and were expected by the SADF. In a series of bitter fights between 9 September and 7 October they prevented the FAPLA from crossing the river and stopped the offensive for a third time. The FAPLA suffered heavy losses and the Soviets withdrew their advisors from the scene, leaving FAPLA without senior leadership. On 29 September the SADF and UNITA launched an offensive aiming to destroy all FAPLA forces east of the Cuito River. On 3 October they attacked and annihilated a FAPLA battalion on the southern banks of the Lomba River and two days later FAPLA started its retreat to Cuito Cuanavale. The SADF and UNITA pursued the retreating FAPLA units and started the siege of Cuito Cuanavale on 14 October with long-range shelling by 155-mm artillery from a distance of 30 to 40 km.

Cuito Cuanavale, only a village, was important to FAPLA as a forward air base to patrol and defend southern Angola and considered an important gateway to UNITA's headquarters in the southeast. With UNITA and the South Africans on the counter-attack, the town and base and possibly all of Cuando Cubango were now under threat, as was FAPLA's planned advance southwards against UNITA; on 15 November Luanda requested urgent military assistance from Cuba. Castro approved the Cuban intervention, Operation Maniobra XXXI Anniversario on the same day, retaking the initiative from the Soviets. As in 1975, Cuba again did not inform the USSR in advance of its decision to intervene. For the second time Cuba dispatched a large contingent of troops and arms across the ocean: 15,000 troops and equipment, including tanks, artillery, anti-aircraft weapons and aircraft. Although not responsible for the dismal situation of the FAPLA Cuba felt impelled to intervene in order to prevent a total disaster for the MPLA. In Castro's view, a UNITA and South African victory would have meant the capture of Cuito and the destruction of the best MPLA military formations.

Around mid-January Castro let the MPLA know that he was taking charge and the first Cuban enforcements were deployed at Cuito Cuanavale. The Cubans' initial priority was saving Cuito Cuanavale, but while enforcements were arriving at the besieged garrison they made preparations for a second front in Lubango, where the SADF had been operating unhindered for where years. By early November, the SADF and UNITA had cornered FAPLA units in Cuito Cuanavale and was poised to destroy them. On 25 November the UN Security Council demanded the SADF's unconditional withdrawal from Angola by 10 December, but the U.S. ensured that there were no repercussions for South Africa. U.S. Assistant Secretary for Africa Chester Crocker reassured Pretoria's ambassador: "The resolution did not contain a call for comprehensive sanctions, and did not provide for any assistance to the MPLA. That was no accident, but a consequence of our own efforts to keep the resolution within bounds." Through December the situation for the besieged MPLA became critical as SADF-UNITA tightened the noose around Cuito Cuanavale. Observers expected it to fall into South African hands soon, and UNITA prematurely announced the town had been taken.

Starting 21 December the South Africans planned the final operation to "pick off" the five FAPLA brigades which were still to the east of the Cuito river "before moving in to occupy the town if the conditions were favourable". From mid-January to the end of February SADF-UNITA launched six major assaults on FAPLA positions east of the Cuito river, none of which delivered tangible results. Although the first attack on 13 January 1988 was successful, spelling near disaster for a FAPLA brigade, they were unable to continue and retreated to the starting positions. After a month the SADF was ready for the second assault on 14 February. Again it withdrew after successfully driving FAPLA-Cuban units off the Chambinga high ground. Narrowly escaping catastrophe the FAPLA units east of the Cuito River withdrew to the Tumpo (river) triangle, a smaller area, ideally suited to defence. On 19 February the SADF-UNITA suffered a first major setback when a third assault against a FAPLA battalion north of the Dala river was repelled; they were unable to reach FAPLA's forward positions and had to withdraw. In the following days the Cubans stepped up their air attacks against South African positions. On 25 February the FAPLA-Cubans repelled a fourth assault and the SADF had to retreat to their positions east of the Tumpo River. The failure of this attack "proved a turning point of the battle of Cuito Cuanavale, boosting FAPLA's flagging morale and bringing the South African advance to a standstill." A fifth attempt was beaten back on 29 February, delivering the SADF a third consecutive defeat. After some more preparation the South Africans and UNITA launched their last and fourth unsuccessful attack on 23 March. As SADF-Colonel Jan Breytenbach wrote, the South African assault "was brought to a grinding and definite halt" by the combined Cuban and FAPLA forces.

Angola

Eventually Cuban troop strength in Angola increased to about 55,000, with 40,000 deployed in the south. Due to the international arms embargo since 1977, South Africa's aging air force was outclassed by the sophisticated Soviet-supplied air defence system and air-strike capabilities fielded by the MPLA, and it was unable to uphold the air supremacy it had enjoyed for years; its loss in turn proved to be critical to the outcome of the battle on the ground.

Cuito Cuanavale was the major battle site between Cuban, Angolan, Namibian and South African forces. It was the biggest battle on African soil since World War II and in its course just under 10,000 soldiers were killed. Cuban planes and 1,500 Cuban soldiers had reinforced the MPLA at Cuito. After the failed assault on 23 March 1988, the SADF withdrew leaving a 1,500-man "holding force" behind and securing their retreat with one of the most heavily mined areas in the world. Cuito Cuanavale continued to be bombarded from a distance of 30 to 40 km.

=== Western front ===
In the meantime, on 10 March 1988, when the defence of Cuito Cuanavale after three failed SADF attacks was secure, Cuban, FAPLA and SWAPO units advanced from Lubango to the southwest. The first South African resistance was encountered near Calueque on 15 March, followed by three months of bloody clashes as the Cubans progressed towards the Namibian border. By the end of May Cuba had two divisions in southwestern Angola. By June they constructed two forward airbases at Cahama and Xangongo with which Cuban air power could be projected into Namibia. All of southern Angola was covered by a radar network and SA-8 air defence ending South African air superiority.

On 26 May 1988, the chief of the SADF announced, "heavily armed Cuban and SWAPO forces, integrated for the first time, have moved south within 60km of the Namibian border". The remaining SADF forces at Cuito Cuanavale were now in danger of being closed in. On 8 June 1988 the SADF called up 140,000 men of the reserves (Citizen Force), giving an indication of how serious the situation had become. The South African administrator general in Namibia acknowledged on 26 June that Cuban MiG-23s were flying over Namibia, a dramatic reversal from earlier times when the skies had belonged to the SAAF. He added, "the presence of the Cubans had caused a flutter of anxiety" in South Africa.

In June 1988 the Cubans prepared to advance on Calueque starting from Xangongo and Tchipa. In case of serious South African counterattacks, Castro gave orders to be ready to destroy the Ruacana reservoirs and transformers and attack South African bases in Namibia. The offensive started from Xangongo on 24 June immediately clashing with the SADF en route to Cuamato. Although the SADF was driven off, the FAPLA-Cubans retreated to their base. On 26 July 1989 the SADF shelled Tchipa (Techipa) with long-range artillery and Castro gave orders for the immediate advance on Calueque and an air strike against the SADF camps and military installations around Calueque. After a clash with a FAPLA-Cuban advance group on 27 June the SADF retreated towards Calueque under bombardment from Cuban planes and crossed the border into Namibia that same afternoon. By then, Cuban MiG-23s had carried out the attacks on the SADF positions around the Calueque dam, 11 km north of the Namibian border, also damaging the bridge and hydroelectric installations. The major force of the Cubans, still on the way, never saw action and returned to Tchipa. With the retreat of the SADF into Namibia on 27 June the hostilities ceased.

The CIA reported that "Cuba's successful use of air power and the apparent weakness of Pretoria's air defences" highlighted the fact that Havana had achieved air superiority in southern Angola and northern Namibia. Only a few hours after the Cuban air strike, the SADF destroyed the nearby bridge over the Cunene River. They did so, the CIA surmised, "to deny Cuban and Angolan ground forces easy passage to the Namibia border and to reduce the number of positions they must defend." The South Africans, impressed by the suddenness and scale of the Cuban advance and believing that a major battle "involved serious risks" withdrew. Five days later Pretoria ordered a combat group still operational in southeastern Angola to scale back to avoid any more casualties, effectively withdrawing from all fighting, and a SADF division was deployed in defence of Namibia's northern border.

== Cuba and the Three Powers Accord ==
The negotiations and accords until 1988 had all been bilateral, either between MPLA and the U.S., MPLA and South Africa or the U.S. and South Africa. Luanda refused any direct contact with UNITA, instead looking for direct talks with Savimbi's sponsors in Pretoria and Washington. The negotiations usually took place in third countries and were mediated by third countries. The U.S., although clandestinely supporting the UNITA, often acted as a mediator itself. From 1986, the Soviet Union expressed its interest in a political solution. It was increasingly included in consultations but never directly involved in the negotiations. Endeavours for a settlement had intensified after the fighting in southern Angola broke out in 1987. It was agreed, that this time only governments were to take part in the negotiations, which excluded participation by UNITA.

From the start of the negotiations in 1981, the Cubans had not asked and were not asked to participate and the Americans did not have it in mind to include them. Castro signalled interest to the U.S. in July 1987 while preparations for the FAPLA offensive against UNITA were under way. He let the Americans know that negotiations including the Cubans would be much more promising. But it was not until January 1988 that U.S. Secretary of State George Shultz authorized the American delegation to hold direct talks with the Cubans with the strict provision that they only discuss matters of Angola and Namibia but not the US embargo against Cuba. The Cuban government joined negotiations on 28 January 1988. They conceded that their withdrawal had to include all troops in Angola including the 5,000 they had in mind to keep in the north and in Cabinda for protection of the oil fields. Yet, U.S. support for UNITA was going to be continued and was not to be an issue at the discussions.

The U.S. continued its two-track policy, mediating between Luanda and Pretoria as well as providing aid to UNITA through Kamina airbase in Zaire. The Reagan administration's first priority was to get the Cubans out of Angola. In its terminology, by supporting UNITA the U.S. was conducting "low-intensity-warfare". According to a western diplomat in Luanda, the U.S. "first wanted to get the Cubans out and afterwards wanted to ask the South Africans to kindly retreat from Namibia". David Albright reported that South African officials believe that Armscor's preparations for a nuclear test at Vastrap were discovered by Soviet or Western intelligence agencies, and that this discovery led to increased pressure on Cuba and the Soviet Union to withdraw from Angola.

Crocker had initially been unable to convince anyone in Europe of his linkage concept, which tied Namibian independence to Cuban withdrawal. On the contrary, the European Union was ready to help with Angolan reconstruction.

Pretoria had walked out of the negotiations two years before and it was necessary to get South Africa back to the table. On 16 March 1988, the South African Business Day reported that Pretoria was "offering to withdraw into Namibia -- not from Namibia -- in return for the withdrawal of Cuban forces from Angola. The implication is that South Africa has no real intention of giving up the territory any time soon." After much coaxing the South African government joined negotiations in Cairo on 3 May 1988 expecting Resolution 435 to be modified. Defence Minister Malan and President P.W. Botha asserted that South Africa would withdraw from Angola only "if Russia and its proxies did the same." They did not mention withdrawing from Namibia.

In July 1987, Cuba and Angola had offered to speed up Cuban withdrawal. 20,000 troops stationed south of the 13th parallel could be sent home within two instead of three years on the condition that the SADF retreated from Angola, that U.S. and South African support for UNITA was terminated, that Angola's sovereignty was respected and UN Resolution 435 was implemented. Botha flatly rejected any move before the Cubans withdrew from Angola. In order to "torpedo" the initiatives, Malan "innocently" suggested direct negotiations with Moscow so that the Angola conflict could be solved after the example of Afghanistan. The Kremlin responded mockingly that Angola and Afghanistan hardly had more in common than the initial letters in their name. Thus, the timeframe of withdrawal remained the biggest obstacle for a settlement. Chester Crocker proposed a tighter timeframe of total withdrawal within three years which the Angolans rejected.

It was only after the battle at Cuito Cuanavale that the Botha government showed a real interest in peace negotiations. The Cuban military strategy in southern Angola in 1988 brought urgency to the negotiations. After stopping the SADF counter offensive at Cuito Cuanavale and opening a second front to the west, the Cubans in Angola had raised the stakes and reversed the situation on the ground. In fact, the U.S. wondered whether the Cubans would stop their advance at the Namibian border. The heavy loss of life at Calueque sparked outrage in South Africa and it ordered an immediate retrenchment. The SADF forces remaining in eastern Angola were instructed to avoid further casualties. After the bloody clashes on 27 June, the SADF on 13 July set up 10 Division in defence of northern Namibia, in case the Cubans attempted an invasion. Thus, Jorge Risquet, head of the Cuban delegation, responded to South African demands: "The time for your military adventures, for the acts of aggression that you have pursued with impunity, for your massacres of refugees... is over… South Africa is acting as though it was a victorious army, rather than what it really is: a defeated aggressor that is withdrawing... South Africa must face the fact that it will not obtain at the negotiating table what it could not achieve on the battlefield." Crocker cabled Secretary of State George Shultz that the talks had taken place "against the backdrop of increasing military tension surrounding the large build-up of heavily armed Cuban troops in south-west Angola in close proximity to the Namibian border.... The Cuban build-up in southwest Angola has created an unpredictable military dynamic."

The Cubans were the driving force behind the negotiations in the final phase beginning in July 1988. The MPLA allies, first wanting to maintain the status quo after the successes in the south, had to be persuaded to continue. Worried that the fighting in Cunene escalated into an all-out war, Crocker achieved a first breakthrough in New York on 13 July. The Cubans replaced Jorge Risquet by the more conciliatory Carlos Aldana Escalante and agreed in general to withdraw from Angola in turn for Namibian independence. (See also Tripartite Accord (1988) for Botha's account of his coming to an understanding with Risquet, as documented in the 2007 French documentary Cuba, an African Odyssey.) Cuba's calculations were simple: Once the South Africans were out of Namibia and Resolution 435 was implemented, Pretoria would be without a safe base to operate from and to destabilize the MPLA government. The Luanda government could hold off UNITA without Cuban help. Cuba also figured that SWAPO, their regional ally, would pipe the tune in Namibia.

In the "New York Principles" the parties agreed to settle their differences through negotiations. The following round of talks in Cape Verde, 22–23 July 1988, only produced a commitment to set up a Joint Monitoring Commission which was to oversee the withdrawals. On 5 August, the three parties signed the "Geneva Protocol" laying out South African withdrawal from Angola starting 10 August and to be completed 1 September. By then Cubans and the MPLA were to agree on Cuban troop withdrawal. On 10 September a tripartite peace settlement was to be signed and Resolution 435 was to be implemented on 1 November. A ceasefire came into effect on 8 August 1988. Pretoria pulled its remaining forces out of Angola by 30 August 1988. Cuban and SWAPO forces moved away from the southern border. By then, a formula for the Cuban withdrawal from Angola had not been found as there was still a gap of 41 months between the Cuban and South African proposal and it took another five rounds of talks between August and October 1988 to find a settlement. The negotiations were interrupted to await the outcome of the U.S. elections in which George H. W. Bush succeeded Ronald Reagan on 8 November 1988. In the meantime, a FAPLA offensive was under way and UNITA was close to collapse threatening another South African intervention and putting Cuban forces in Angola on alert. Yet, Pretoria did not have in mind to endanger the talks and refrained from interference.

It was only after the U.S. elections that the parties agreed on a timetable for the Cubans. On 22 December 1988, one month before Reagan's second term ended, Angola, Cuba and South Africa signed the Three Powers Accord in New York, arranging for the withdrawal of South African troops from Angola and Namibia, the independence of Namibia and the withdrawal of Cuban troops from Angola. Cuba agreed to an overall time frame of 30 months and to withdraw within 27 months after implementation of Resolution 435. The timetable agreed upon provided for the following steps:

- until 1 April 1989: withdrawal of 3,000 Cuban troops (3 months)
- 1 April 1989: Implementation of Resolution 435 and start of 27-month time frame for total withdrawal
- 1 August 1989: all Cuban troops moved north of 15th parallel (7 months)
- 31 October 1989: all Cuban troops moved north of 13th parallel (10 months)
- 1 November 1989: free elections in Namibia and 50% of all Cuban troops withdrawn from Angola
- 1 April 1990: 66% of all Cuban troops withdrawn (15 months)
- 1 October 1990: 76% of all Cuban troops withdrawn (21 months)
- 1 July 1991: Cuban withdrawal completed (30 months)

The accord ended 13 years of Cuban military presence in Angola which was finalized one month early on 25 May 1991, when General Samuel Rodiles Planas boarded the aircraft that took him back to the island. At the same time the Cubans removed their troops from Pointe Noire (Republic of the Congo) and Ethiopia.

== Aftermath ==
Cuban intervention had a substantial impact on Southern Africa, especially in defending the MPLA's control over large parts of Angola as well as helping secure Namibia's independence. On 26 July 1991, on occasion of the celebrations of the 38th anniversary of the start of the Cuban Revolution, Nelson Mandela delivered a speech in Havana praising Cuba for its role in Angola:

The Cuban people hold a special place in the hearts of the people of Africa. The Cuban internationalists have made a contribution to African independence, freedom and justice unparalleled for its principled and selfless character - We in Africa are used to being victims of countries wanting to carve up our territory or subvert our sovereignty. It is unparalleled in African history to have another people rise to the defence of one of us - The defeat of the apartheid army was an inspiration to the struggling people in South Africa! Without the defeat of Cuito Cuanavale our organizations would not have been unbanned! The defeat of the racist army at Cuito Cuanavale has made it possible for me to be here today! Cuito Cuanavale was a milestone in the history of the struggle for southern African liberation!

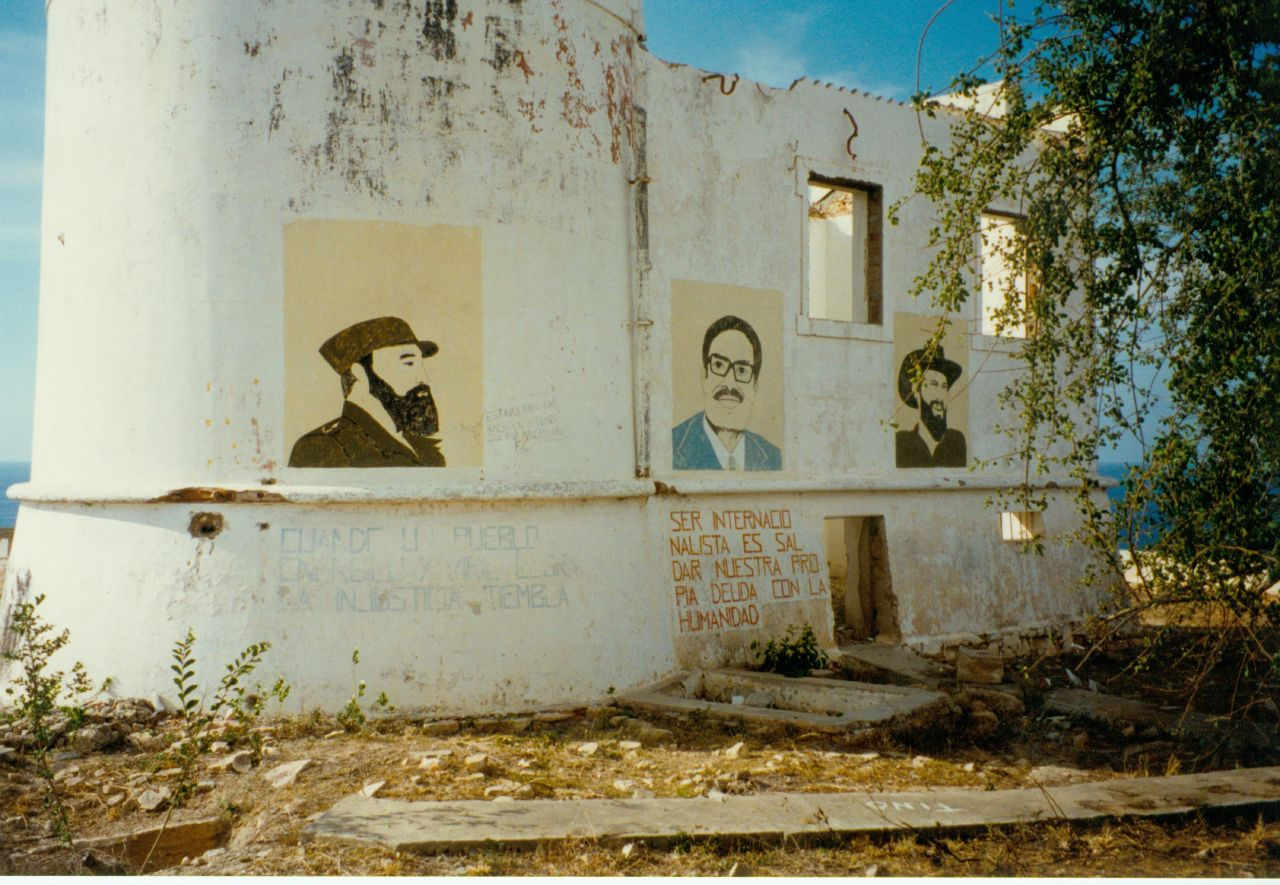
Destroyed lighthouse in Lobito, Angola, 1995

Cuban intervention was also criticized, with Dr. Peter Hammond, a South African missionary linked to Frontline Fellowship, recalling:

There were over 50,000 Cuban troops in the country. The communists had attacked and destroyed many churches. MiG-23s and Mi-24 Hind helicopter gun ships were terrorising villagers in Angola. I documented numerous atrocities, including the strafing of villages, schools and churches.

In a national ceremony on 7 December 1988, all Cubans killed in Africa were buried in cemeteries across the island. According to Cuban government figures, during all of the Cuban foreign intervention missions carried out in Africa from the early 1960s to the withdrawal of the last soldier from Angola on 25 May 1991, a total of 2,289 Cubans were killed. Other analysts have noted that of 36,000 Cuban troops committed to fighting in Angola from 1975 to 1979, combat deaths were close to 5,000 in number.

Free elections in Namibia were held in November 1989 with SWAPO taking 57% of the vote in spite of Pretoria's attempts to swing the elections in favor of other parties. Namibia gained independence in March 1990.

The situation in Angola was anything but settled and the country continued to be ravaged by civil war for more than a decade. The MPLA won the 1992 election, however eight opposition parties rejected the 1992 election as rigged. UNITA sent peace negotiators to the capital, where the MPLA murdered them, along with thousands of UNITA members. Savimbi was still ready to continue the elections. The MPLA then massacred tens of thousands of UNITA voters nationwide, in an event known as the Halloween Massacre. UNITA leader Jonas Savimbi would not accept the results and refused to join the Angolan parliament as opposition. Again UNITA took up arms, financed with the sale of blood diamonds. The civil war ended in 2002 after Jonas Savimbi was killed in battle.

== See also ==
- South African Border War
- Angolan Civil War
- Mallin, Jay (1987). Cuba in Angola. Coral Gables, Fla.: Research Institute for Cuban Studies, Graduate School of International Studies, University of Miami. OCLC 17560083.
- Cabinda War

== Bibliography ==
- Clodfelter, M. (2017). Warfare and Armed Conflicts: A Statistical Encyclopedia of Casualty and Other Figures, 1492-2015 (4th ed.). Jefferson, North Carolina: McFarland. ISBN 978-0786474707.
- George, Edward The Cuban Intervention in Angola, 1965-1991, Frank Cass, London, New York, 2005, ISBN 0-415-35015-8
- Gleijeses, Piero: Conflicting Missions: Havana, Washington, and Africa, 1959-1976, The University of North Carolina Press, 2003 ISBN 0-8078-5464-6
- Smith, Wayne: A Trap in Angola in: Foreign Policy No. 62, Spring 1986, Carnegie Endowment for International Peace
