= Angola–Cuba Declaration of 1984 =

In the Angola–Cuba Declaration of 1984, signed 19 March 1984 in Havana by president José Eduardo dos Santos of Angola and Fidel Castro, premier of Cuba, the two countries agreed to the withdrawal of Cuban forces from Angola after the withdrawal of South African troops from Angola and Namibia, and after UN-Security Council resolution 435 on Namibian independence was strictly applied.

Soon after getting independence from Portugal in 1975, civil war was fought among the three leading groups in Angola. Angola's three main guerrilla groups agreed to establish a transitional government in January 1975. Within two months, however, the FNLA, MPLA and UNITA had started fighting each other and the country began splitting into zones controlled by rival armed political groups.

The MPLA gained control of the capital Luanda and much of the rest of the country. With the support of the United States, Zaïre and South Africa intervened militarily in favour of the FNLA and UNITA with the intention of taking Luanda before the declaration of independence. In response, Cuba intervened in favor of the MPLA, which became a flash point for the Cold War. With Cuban support, the MPLA held Luanda and declared independence on 11 November 1975, with Agostinho Neto becoming the first president, though the civil war continued. José Eduardo dos Santos became the first elected President of Angola from the MPLA-LT and continued to get the support of Cuba.

== Background ==
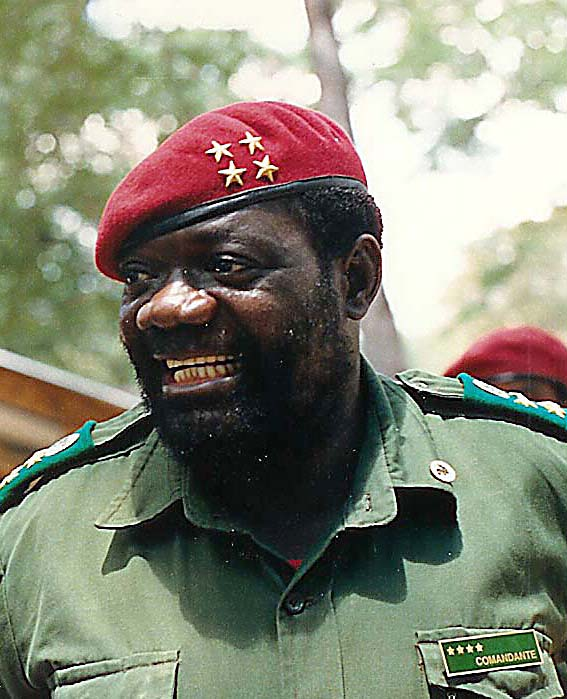
Jonas Savimbi, the leader or UNITA, the major opposition party

Angola was a colony of Portugal for more than 400 years from the 15th century. The demand for independence in Angola picked up momentum during the early 1950s. The Portuguese régime, refused to accede to the demands for independence, provoking an armed conflict that started in 1961 when freedom fighters attacked both white and black civilians in cross-border operations in northeastern Angola, which was called the Colonial War. The principal protagonists included the People's Movement for the Liberation of Angola (MPLA), founded in 1956, the National Front for the Liberation of Angola (FNLA), which appeared in 1961, and the National Union for the Total Independence of Angola (UNITA), founded in 1966. After many years of conflict that weakened all of the insurgent parties, Angola gained its independence on 11 November 1975, after the 1974 coup d'état in Lisbon, Portugal, which overthrew the Portuguese régime headed by Marcelo Caetano.

Portugal's new revolutionary leaders began in 1974 a process of political change at home and accepted independence for its former colonies abroad. In Angola a fight for dominance broke out immediately between the three nationalist movements. The events prompted a mass exodus of Portuguese citizens, creating up to 300 000 destitute Portuguese refugees—the retornados. The new Portuguese government tried to mediate an understanding between the three competing movements, which was initially agreed by the movements, but later disagreed. After it gained independence in November 1975, Angola experienced a devastating civil war which lasted several decades. It claimed millions of lives and produced many refugees; it didn't end until 2002.

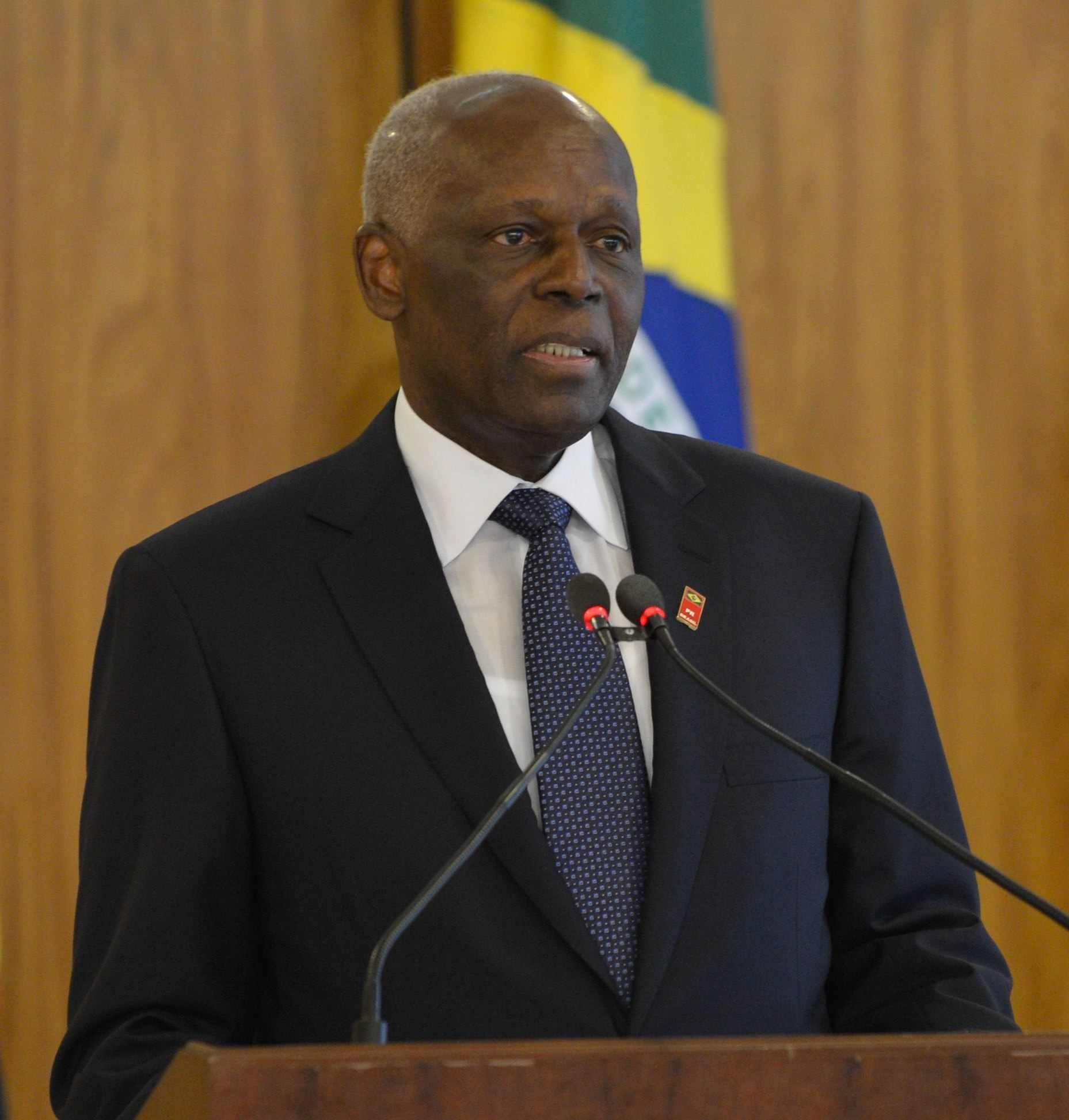
José Eduardo dos Santos who won and became the President of Angola in the elections

Following negotiations held in Portugal, itself experiencing severe social and political turmoil and uncertainty due to the April 1974 revolution, Angola's three main guerrilla groups agreed to establish a transitional government in January 1975. Within two months, however, the FNLA, MPLA and UNITA had started fighting each other and the country began splitting into zones controlled by rival armed political groups. The MPLA gained control of the capital Luanda and much of the rest of the country. With the support of the United States, Zaïre and South Africa intervened militarily in favour of the FNLA and UNITA with the intention of taking Luanda before the declaration of independence. In response, Cuba intervened in favor of the MPLA, which became a flash point for the Cold War. With Cuban support, the MPLA held Luanda and declared independence on 11 November 1975, with Agostinho Neto becoming the first president, though the civil war continued. At this time, most of the half-million Portuguese who lived in Angola – and who had accounted for the majority of the skilled workers in public administration, agriculture, industries and trade – fled the country, leaving its once prosperous and growing economy in a state of bankruptcy.

== Cuban intervention in Angola ==
Cuban intervention in Angola is believed to have started during the 1960s, but the actual deployment of troops started only by 1975 when Angola got independence from Portugal. Experts see ideological confluence between Cuba and MLPA of Angola and also the common Portuguese roots. Cuba had been supportive to Angola in resisting a series of attacks by the combined forces of South Africa and their sponsored guerillas UNITA over the oil reserves in Cabinda coast. United States were trying to broker peace by seeking systematic withdrawal of troops of Cuba from the region with the simultaneous reduction of troops by South Africa. The neutrality of US was questioned after it started supporting UNITA. President José Eduardo Dos Santos of Angola resisted pressure from United Nations for the withdrawal of troops of Cuba quoting South African attacks in Angola from 1981-85. Angola also received support in terms of teaching, construction workers and doctors, the gap left on account of migration of Whites from the nation soon after the independence. Cuban soldiers allegedly received greater acclaim in the home country and were proud to be part of the troops to Angola. There were also allegations that Cuban soldiers contracted AIDS while at Angola, but it was strongly denied.

== Declaration ==
The declaration was a confirmation of a joint declaration by the two governments made 4 February 1982. The declaration reaffirmed that Angola and Cuba “will resume, by their own decision and in exercise of their sovereignty, the execution of the gradual withdrawal of the Cuban internationalist military contingent as soon as the following requisites are fulfilled;

- 1. The unilateral withdrawal of the racist South African troops from Angolan territory.
- 2. The strict application of Resolution 435-78 of the UN Security Council, the accession of Namibia to its true independence, and the total withdrawal of the South African troops that are illegally occupying that country.
- 3. An end to any act of direct aggression or threat of aggression against the Republic of Angola on the part of South Africa, the United States of America, and their allies.” The declaration also demanded an end to the support of UNITA (National Union for the Total Independence of Angola), and other organizations by South Africa, the United States, and their allies. The declaration was signed by José Eduardo dos Santos, the President of Angola during his visit of Cuba with the Cuban chief Fidel Castro. Santos gave a statement that "The Governments of Cuba and Angola reiterate that they shall restart, on their own decision and exercising their sovereignty, the implementation of the gradual withdrawal as soon as the conditions are met."

== See also ==
- Alvor Accords
- Angolan Civil War
- Bicesse Accords
- Cuban intervention in Angola
- Nakuru Agreement
