= XNS =

XNS or xns may refer to:

== Computing ==
- Xerox Network Systems, an early computer networking protocol suite
- Extensible Name Service, an XML-based digital identity architecture

== Other uses ==
- Kanashi language (ISO 639:xns), a Sino-Tibetan language
- Navtech System Support (IATA code: XNS), in the List of airline codes
- Christians (XNS), in the List of acronyms: X
