= XC =

XC may refer to:

== Science and technology ==
- XC (programming language), a concurrent programming language developed by XMOS
- Capacitive reactance or X_{C}, a property of a capacitor
- Exact cover problem, in theoretical computer science
- Xeno-canto, citizen science website for bird calls
- Xerox copy, in correspondence
- Xylene cyanol, a color marker used in gel electrophoresis

== Sport ==
- Cross country running
- Cross-country skiing
- Cross-country cycling
- Cross-country riding
- Cross-country gliding

== Symbols ==
- 90 (number), in Roman numerals
- Christogram, a mongram for Jesus Christ

== Transport ==
=== Aviation ===
- Corendon Airlines, Turkey (founded 2004; IATA designator: XC)
- KD Air, Canada (1990–2019; obsolete IATA designator: XC)
- Wills Wing XC, an American hang glider design
- XC, a Mexican government aircraft registration prefix
- XC, United States aircraft designator for Experimental Cargo

=== Land transport ===
- Ford Falcon (XC), an Australian series of car models
- XC Trains Limited (trading as: CrossCountry), a British rail operator

== Other uses ==
- Xenoblade Chronicles, a series of video games developed by Microsoft
- Xavier College, a school in maten a pedro sanchez, Murcia

== See also ==
- 10C (disambiguation)
- Cross country
