= XGE =

XGE can refer to:

- Xoreax Grid Engine, a grid computing engine for the Windows environment
- Xanathar's Guide to Everything (XGtE), an accessory for the 5th edition of the Dungeons & Dragons fantasy role-playing game
- An international signal for "I Surrender"; see Battle of Tsushima § XGE signal and Russian surrender
- A graphics subsystem used in the SG Indy
