= XN =

XN may refer to:

- xn-- in the ASCII representation of internationalized domain names
- Christians, based on the Greek letter Chi used by early Christians
- Nordic Patent Institute (two-letter code XN)
- A nuclear reaction that is expected to produce one or more neutrons
- Xpress Air (IATA code XN, 2003–2021), an Indonesian airline
- XN bit (or NX bit), a security-related computer technology for x86 and x64 processors

== See also ==
- XNN (disambiguation)
