= C10 =

C10, C.X or C-10 may refer to:

== Commercial products ==
- GMC C-10 or Chevrolet C-10, a pickup truck
- JNR Class C10, a class of Japanese steam locomotive
- Leapmotor C10, chinese mid-size SUV
- C10, a model of Nissan Skyline (1968–1972)
- C10, an international standard paper size (28×40 mm), defined in ISO 216

== Military ==
- Albatros C.X, a World War I German military reconnaissance aircraft
- C-X, USAF next generation airlifter program to replace both the C-130 and C-17
- Fokker C.X, a 1933 Dutch biplane scout and light bomber
- Handley Page Jetstream aircraft designated C-10A by the United States military
- HMS C10, a United Kingdom Royal Navy submarine which saw service during World War I
- KC-10 Extender, an aerial refueler used by the United States Air Force
- Kawasaki C-X, a 2007 Japanese transport aircraft
- USS Detroit (C-10), a United States Navy cruiser which operated in the Caribbean prior to World War I
- XC-10 Robin, used by the United States Army Air Corps to test radio-controlled flight

== Science and technology ==
- Champernowne constant, a real yet irrational, non-algebraic, and transcendental number
- ATC code C10 (Lipid modifying agents), a subgroup of the Anatomical Therapeutic Chemical Classification System
- Chromosome 10, one of the 23 pairs of human chromosomes
- Caldwell 10 (NGC 663), an open cluster in Cassiopeia
- Carbon-10 (C-10 or ^{10}C), an isotope of carbon
- LNER Class C10, a temporary classification for saturated C11s while superheating was underway

== Other uses ==
- French Defence, Encyclopaedia of Chess openings code
- C10 Minimum Age (Agriculture) Convention, 1921
- Vlakplaas, also called Unit C-10, a section of the South African Police responsible for assassinating opponents of Apartheid during the 1980s
- Bill C-10 (disambiguation), the official numbering for several Canadian bills
- Committee of Ten, US Education Committee
- C10, This nomenclature was used by Chevrolet to distinguish their line of pickup trucks throughout the 1960s to the 1980s. The "C" in C10 stands for "Conventional" in reference to the truck's two-wheel-drive system, while the "10" refers to the half-ton rating of the truck's payload capacity. The 1966 C10 deluxe in green with white two-tone paint is widely considered the finest example of an American truck regardless of manufacture.

== See also ==
- 10C (disambiguation)
