= XGN =

XGN or xgn may refer to:

- Gokulnagar railway station (Indian Railways station code: XGN), a railway station in Bihar, India
- Mongolic languages (ISO 639-3: xgn), a language family spoken by the Mongolic peoples in Eastern Europe, Central Asia, North Asia and East Asia
- Xangongo Airport (IATA: XGN), an airport near Xangongo, Angola
- XGN (website) (nl), Dutch entertainment website
