= XHS (disambiguation) =

XHS may refer to:

- RedNote, a Chinese social networking website
- XHS-FM, a radio station (100.9 FM) in Tampico, Tamaulipas, Mexico
- XHS-TDT, a television station (channel 23, virtual 4) in Ensenada, Baja California, Mexico
- Xenia High School, Xenia, Ohio, USA
- Xavier High School, several schools by the name; see List of schools named after Francis Xavier

== See also ==
- XH (disambiguation), for the singular of XHs
