= XNA =

XNA or xna may refer to:

- Microsoft XNA, a toolset for game developers from Microsoft
- Northwest Arkansas National Airport (IATA code)
- Old North Arabian (ISO 639-3 language code: xna)
- X-No-Archive, a Usenet newsgroup header
- Xeno nucleic acid, artificial genetic material alternative to DNA
- Xinhua News Agency, the official state-run press agency of the People's Republic of China
