= XPT =

XPT can mean multiple things:

- New South Wales XPT, passenger train operated by NSW TrainLink in New South Wales, Australia
- The ISO 4217 code for the value of one troy ounce of platinum
- The filename extension .xpt is used for XPConnect type libraries
- A subsidiary of Nio Inc.
