= XPF =

XPF may refer to:

- CFP franc, the currency used in the French overseas collectivities (collectivités d’outre-mer, or COM) of French Polynesia, New Caledonia and Wallis and Futuna
- ERCC4, an enzyme that in humans is encoded by the ERCC4 gene
- The Extended Control Program Facility (XPF), a component of the IBM i operating system
- X Prize Foundation; offers inducement prize contests to encourage spaceflight and other technological development
