= XAF =

XAF may refer to:

- Central African CFA franc (ISO4217 Currency Code)
- The Bizana, Eastern Cape vehicle registration plates code
- XIAP-associated factor
- XAF Radar, an experimental pre-World War II U.S. Navy radar
- Xaf (music producer), an electronic music producer
