= XFN =

XFN may refer to:

- Cross-functional team, a group of people with different functional expertise
- XHTML Friends Network, an HTML microformat
- X/Open Federated Naming, most commonly implemented as the Federated Naming Service
- Xinhua Financial Network, the blanket term for the companies and services under Xinhua Holdings
- IATA code for Xiangyang Liuji Airport
