= XNC =

XNC may refer to:

- XNC format, a strict subset of the IPC-NC-349 specification
- Xian Coin, the denomination code XNC
- XNC, the vehicle identification number of the NedCar B.V. Mitsubishi Motors
