= XV =

XV or Xv may refer to:

== Arts and entertainment ==
- XV (rapper) (born 1985), rapper from Wichita, Kansas, United States
- XV (King's X album), 2008
- XV (TVXQ album), 2019
- XV (EP), by the Jonas Brothers (2020)

== Science and technology ==
- xv (software), a shareware image display and manipulation program for Unix
- Subaru XV, a compact SUV
- X video extension, an extension to the X Window System
- XV, Experimental Vessel, a military submarine in Project Cetus

== Other uses ==
- 15 (number), in Roman numerals
- Air Vietnam (IATA code XV)
- A Rugby Union team: they have 15 players

== See also ==
- XV Gymnasium
