= XF =

XF may refer to:

== Television ==
- The X Factor, a television music talent show franchise
- The X-Files, a science fiction television show that ran from 1993 to 2002

== Vehicles ==
- XF series, a series of experimental aircraft
- DAF XF, a truck made by DAF Trucks
- Jaguar XF, a car made by Jaguar since 2008

== Other uses ==
- XF (grade), a letter grade used at some U.S. colleges, assigned to students who are caught performing acts of academic dishonesty
- XF lenses, for Fujifilm X-mount cameras
- Vladivostok Air (IATA airline code XF)
- Extra Fine, in numismatics, a designation of 40 or 45 points on the adapted Sheldon coin grading scale (can also be abbreviated as EF)
- XenForo, a commercial forum software package.
