= XFD =

XFD or xfd may refer to:

- XML Form Definition, a user interface markup language
- .xfd, a filename extension sometimes used for files in the Extensible Forms Description Language
- Douglas XFD, a 1933 naval fighter aircraft prototype
- McDonnell XFD-1 Phantom, a 1945 naval fighter aircraft prototype
- The last column name in Microsoft Excel, XFD
