= XD =

XD or xD may refer to:

== Arts and entertainment ==
- Disney XD, a pay television channel aimed at 6–11-year-old children
- Pokémon XD: Gale of Darkness, a 2005 video game for the GameCube

== Technology ==
- Adobe XD (short for Experience Design; logo Xd), an interface prototyping program
- XD bit (short for execute disable), Intel's name for the NX bit, a CPU memory security option
- XDCAM, a series of products for digital audio+video recording, introduced by Sony in 2003
- xD-Picture Card, a 2002–2009 flash memory card format
- Century Theatres § Cinemark XD (short for Extreme Digital Cinema), a large-format projection technology
- User experience design (UXD, UED, or XD), a field of study focused on enhancing user satisfaction with products

== Vehicles ==
- Ford XD Falcon, an Australian-built family car between 1979 and 1982
- Scion xD, a subcompact hatchback sold by Toyota's youth-oriented division Scion, a.k.a. Toyota Ist (Gen.2) or Urban Cruiser.
- DOK-ING XD, a Croatian concept car made by DOK-ING
- New Flyer XD40 and XD60, model numbers for its Xcelsior transit bus family
- Defender XD (extra duty), a model of Land Rover Defender
- Hyundai Avante XD, a name for the 3rd Generation of Hyundai Elantra (XD Series) (South Korea)

== Other uses ==
- XD, an emoticon commonly used to symbolize extreme laughter or happiness
- Independence Party (Iceland) (xD)
- Springfield Armory XD, a line of semi-automatic pistols marketed by Springfield Armory
