= XJL =

XJL may refer to:

- Columbia XJL, a large single-engined amphibian aircraft
- A long-wheelbase version of Jaguar XJ (X351), also known as XJL
