= Bill C-10 =

Bill C-10 may refer to several Canadian federal bills over time, including:

- Bill C-10: Income Tax Amendments Act, 2006, introduced in 2006 as Bill C-33; reintroduced 2007 as Bill C-10 / 2nd session of 39th Parliament; not passed
- Safe Streets and Communities Act, passed 12 March 2012 / 1st session of the 41st Parliament
- An Act to amend the Broadcasting Act, introduced 3 November 2020 / 2nd session of the 43rd Parliament
