= XJ =

XJ may refer to:

- Mesaba Airlines (IATA airline code XJ, 1974-2012)
- Thai AirAsia X (IATA airline code XJ since 2014)
- Jaguar XJ, a car series made by Jaguar
- XJ music, a collaborative instrument for ambient music production
- Jeep Cherokee (XJ), an internal vehicle code used by Jeep
- Yamaha XJ650 Maxim, a motorcycle series made by Yamaha
- Xinjiang, an autonomous region of China (Guobiao abbreviation XJ)
