= Chase-Sisley C100-S =

American glider

C100-S

General information
- Type: Glider
- National origin: United States
- Designer: Robert Chase
- Status: No longer in production
- Number built: One

History
- Introduction date: 1968
- First flight: 1968

The Chase-Sisley C100-S is an American mid-wing, single seat FAI Open Class glider that was designed in the 1960s by Dr. Robert Chase.

== Design and development ==
The C100-S project was started by Chase in 1962, with prototype construction commenced near the end of 1963. The resulting aircraft was first flown in 1968.

The aircraft is built from a combination of wood, styrofoam, aluminium and fiberglass. The semi-tapered wing is built from wood and styrofoam, covered with stress-bearing fiberglass. The wing is tapered outboard of the mid-span point. The wing spar is built up from 14 layers of fiberglass and epoxy resin at the root and is a box-style spar that occupies 40% of the wing chord. The wing is constructed in three pieces, a center-section and wing tips and features Schempp-Hirth dive brakes. The wing is 15% thick and employs a NACA 64(3)-615 laminar flow airfoil.

The fuselage is built from aluminium and features stressed skin construction. The landing gear is a fixed monowheel. The pilot's seating position is semi-reclined. In addition to the dive brakes the pilot has a tail-mounted drag chute available.

Only one C100-S was ever built and it is registered in the experimental amateur-built category.

== Operational history ==
The former owner of the glider, Dr. Richard Sisley of Los Angeles, California, reported in 1983 that the aircraft had excellent thermalling flight characteristics.

In May 2011 the sole example produced was still registered with the Federal Aviation Administration.

== Specifications (C100-S) ==
Data from Sailplane Directory and Soaring

General characteristics

- Crew: one
- Wingspan: 55 ft (17 m)
- Wing area: 138 sq ft (12.8 m^{2})
- Aspect ratio: 22:1
- Airfoil: NACA 64(3)-615
- Empty weight: 530 lb (240 kg)
- Gross weight: 730 lb (331 kg)

Performance

- Maximum glide ratio: 38:1 at 55 mph (88 km/h)
- Rate of sink: 120 ft/min (0.61 m/s) at 48 mph (77 km/h)
- Wing loading: 5.3 lb/sq ft (26 kg/m^{2})

== See also ==
- List of gliders
