= 10C =

10C or X-C may refer to:

- HP-10C series, a 1981 Hewlett-Packard calculators series
- Oflag X-C, a World War II German prisoner-of-war camp for officers located near Lübeck in northern Germany
- Route 10C (WMATA), a bus route operated by the Washington Metropolitan Area Transit Authority
- Tenth Cambridge Survey of Radio Sources, Cambridge radio survey at 15.7GHz
- Carbon-10 (^{10}C), an isotope of carbon

== See also ==
- C10 (disambiguation)
