= XKS =

XKS or xks may refer to:

- XKS, the IATA code for Kasabonika Airport, Ontario, Canada
- XKS, the Telegraph code for Xiamen North railway station, Fujian, China
- xks, the ISO 639-3 code for Kumbewaha language, Sulawesi, Indonesia
