= XKA =

XKA or xka may refer to:

- XKA, the IATA code for Kantchari Airport, Tapoa, Burkina Faso
- xka, the ISO 639-3 code for Kalkoti language, Pakistan
