= XH =

XH or Xh may refer to:

== Linguistics ==
- Xh (digraph), in linguistics
- Xhosa language (ISO 639 alpha-2 code "xh"), a Bantu language of Southern Africa

== Vehicular ==
- Extreme H (FIA abbreviation XH), a spec SUV offroad racing hydrogen fuel cell powered electric race car series
- XH, the designation for experimental helicopter in the U.S. military under the 1962 United States Tri-Service aircraft designation system
- Ford Falcon (XH), a Ford Australia ute

== Other uses ==
- Chi Heorot (officially: ΧH; romanized: XH), a fraternity at Dartmouth College
- Mexico (International Telecommunication Union callsign prefix XH)

== See also ==
- XHS (disambiguation)
