= XAU =

XAU may refer to:

- The ISO 4217 currency code for one troy ounce of gold
- A symbol for the Philadelphia Gold and Silver Index, an index of precious metal mining company stocks that are traded on the Philadelphia Stock Exchange
