= XK =

XK may refer to:

- XK (protein), a protein responsible for Kx antigen which helps determine a person's blood type
- XK (2015 album), by Brendan Croskerry
- Jaguar XK, a car series made by Jaguar
- Jeep Commander XK, a SUV made by Jeep
- Republic of Kosovo, ISO 3166-1 alpha-2 user-assigned code element XK (user assigned code)
  - .xk, the unofficial ccTLD of the Republic of Kosovo
- CCM Airlines (IATA airline designator XK)
- X-K aka X Kryptonite
- XK, United States aircraft designator for Experimental Tanker
