= XGR =

XGR or xgr may refer to:

- Kangiqsualujjuaq (Georges River) Airport, Quebec, Canada, IATA code XGR
- Garza language, an extinct Pakawan language of Texas and Mexico, ISO 639-3 language code xgr
