= XCD =

XCD can refer to:

- XCD, ISO 4217 currency code for the Eastern Caribbean dollar
- Champforgeuil Airport (IATA code)
- Xerez Club Deportivo, Spanish football club
- Bajaj XCD, 125cc bike by Bajaj Auto of India, released in 2007
- Xuchang East railway station, China Railway pinyin code XCD
