= XGG =

XGG or xgg may refer to:

- XGG, the IATA code for Gorom Gorom Airport, Oudalan, Burkina Faso
- xgg, the ISO 639-3 code for Goreng language, Western Australia
