= X-ray fluorescence holography =

X-ray fluorescence holography (XFH) is a holography method with atomic resolution based on atomic fluorescence. It is a relatively new technique that benefits greatly from the coherent high-power X-rays available from synchrotron sources, such as the Japanese SPring-8 facility.

== Imaging ==
Fluorescent X-rays are scattered by atoms in a sample and provide the object wave, which is referenced to non-scattered X-rays. A holographic pattern is recorded by scanning a detector around the sample, which allows researchers to investigate the local 3D structure around a specific element in a sample.

== Applications ==
It is useful for investigating the effects of irradiation on high temperature superconductors.

== Twin picture ==
One of the criticisms for this method is that it suffers from twin images. D. Gabor. Barton proposed that reconstructed phased images of holograms will suppress twin images effects.
