= Incredibuild =

Grid computing software

- Developer: Incredibuild
- Release: 2002; 24 years ago
- Stable release: 10.1.2 / October 30, 2022; 4 years ago
- Operating system: Cross-platform
- Type: Build Accelerator
- License: Proprietary
- Website: www.incredibuild.com

Incredibuild is a suite of grid computing software developed by Incredibuild LTD. Incredibuild is designed to help accelerate computationally-intensive tasks by distributing them over the network, with applications including compiling source code, building software generally, and other software development–related tasks. Jobs can be distributed to several computers over a network, giving both the possibility of accelerating the work by using more resources than were available on the initiating computer alone and potentially freeing local resources for other tasks.

== About ==
In addition to Microsoft Windows and Linux, Incredibuild also supports platforms such as Android, Nintendo Switch, PlayStation 4, and Xbox One. Originally sold specifically as a tool to accelerate compiling, Incredibuild can now be used for other development processes as well as general high performance computing.

Incredibuild is a grid computing software start-up based in Tel Aviv, in Israel. Founded in 2002, the company is led by CEO Tami Mazel Shachar.

In 2002, Incredibuild v1.0 was released, offering a solution for acceleration of Microsoft Visual Studio 6.0 C/C++ code builds. Incredibuild 1.3 was awarded with Game Developer Magazine's annual Front Line Award in The Category of Programing for the year of 2003.

In 2008, Incredibuild won a "Productivity Award" in the Change and Configuration Management Category Of The 18th annual Jolt Awards.

== Tools ==
Incredibuild's software suite is broken up into several, separately-licensable tools. Incredibuild for Visual Studio C/C++ provides Visual Studio integration to accelerate the builds of C and C++ projects. Incredibuild for Make and Other Build Tools provides integration with several standard build tools including make, CMake, and MSBuild. Incredibuild for Dev Tools provides additional interfaces for job distribution, accommodating various tasks beyond those directly related to building or compiling.

== Notable users ==
Incredibuild is used by several software development companies, including a number of video game developers. In 2021, the gaming sector made up 60% of Incredibuild's business. Turn 10 Studios, for instance, used Incredibuild to accelerate builds, rendering from 3DS Max, code analysis, and other tasks during the development of Forza 5. Incredibuild also claims Epic Games, Electronic Arts, id Software, Bohemia Interactive, Scaleform Corporation, FromSoftware, and Bugbear Entertainment as clients. CryEngine and Unreal Engine include built-in support for build acceleration via Incredibuild.

== See also ==
- Distcc
- Electric Cloud
