= Hall XFH =

XFH
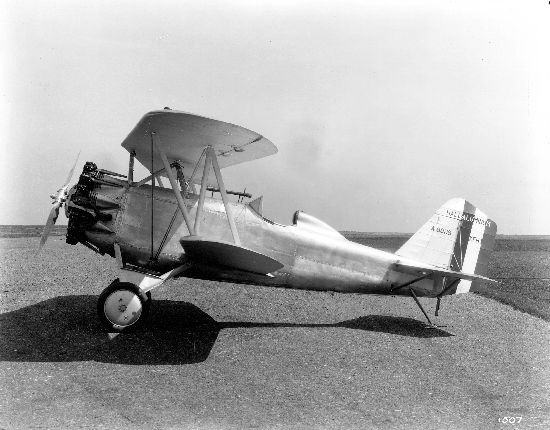

General information
- Type: fighter
- National origin: United States
- Manufacturer: Hall Aluminum Company
- Designer: Charles W. Hall
- Number built: 1

History
- First flight: 1929

The Hall XFH was an American fighter aircraft built by the Hall Aluminum Company. It was the first fighter with a semi-monocoque metal fuselage.

== Development ==
The XFH was designed in 1927 by Charles Hall. It was a single-bay biplane with N-struts for the fabric-covered wings. Its fuselage was made of steel tubing covered with a watertight aluminum skin, enabling it to float if ditched in the ocean. Also for ditching on water or on land, the landing gear could be jettisoned. Power was provided by a Pratt & Whitney Wasp radial engine. Testing in June 1929 showed poor handling characteristics and performance. During one test flight, the upper wing separated from the aircraft. After repairs, the XFH made test flights from an aircraft carrier. Designated XFH by the Bureau of Aeronautics, it was purchased not for active service, but to study new metal construction techniques.

== Specifications ==
Data from The American Fighter from 1917 to the Present

General characteristics

- Crew: one
- Length: 22 ft 6 in (6.85 m)
- Wingspan: 32 ft 0 in (9.75 m)
- Height: 11 ft 0 in (3.35 m)
- Wing area: 255 sq ft (23.68 m^{2})
- Empty weight: 1,773 lb (804 kg)
- Gross weight: 2,514 lb (1,140 kg)
- Powerplant: 1 × Pratt & Whitney Wasp , 450 hp (336 kW)

Performance

- Maximum speed: 153 mph (246 km/h, 133 kn)
- Range: 275 mi (443 km, 239 nmi)
- Service ceiling: 25,300 ft (7,711 m)
- Rate of climb: 1,786 ft/min (9.07 m/s)

Armament

- 2 × .30 in (7.62 mm) machine guns (never installed)
