= XNN =

XNN or xnn may refer to:

- Xining Caojiabao International Airport, Huzhu County, Qinghai, China (IATA code "XNN")
- Northern Kankanaey language, Philippines (ISO 639-3 code "xnn")
