= X-No-Archive =

Archive and X-No-Archive (also known colloquially as XNA or XNAY) are newsgroup article header fields used to control whether the article may put into long-term storage by news servers or other archives.

== History ==
In the early years of Usenet, the volume of articles posted to the network exceeded the storage capacity of most servers, and so they routinely deleted old articles to make room for new ones. DejaNews, launched in 1995, was the first large-scale commercial attempt to provide a persistent archive of the Usenet news feed. Several Usenet users expressed concerns about privacy rights and the possibility that their posts would remain accessible through DejaNews indefinitely. DejaNews addressed these concerns by announcing that it would not archive Usenet messages containing the X-No-Archive: yes header field name and body. (Following the conventions in use at the time, the X- prefix was used to indicate that the header field was a non-standard extension to the Netnews article format.)

The header field was eventually standardized in 2009 as Archive, albeit with the semantics of the yes/no in the header field body reversed.

== Usage ==
X-No-Archive and Archive are designed to follow the standard header protocol, RFC 1036, used in existing newsgroups. In addition to the standard header fields used in all newsgroup articles (From, Subject, Date, etc.) many news readers allow users to add optional fields to a header. Adding a header field of X-No-Archive: yes or Archive: no signals that "the poster does not permit redistribution from publicly accessible long-term or permanent archives."

Some news readers do not allow users to add fields to the header, and in recognition of this limitation, some archives will also process the X-No-Archive field if it appears in the first line of the article body.

If an article's header contains X-No-Archive: no or Archive: yes, or does not contain any X-No-Archive or Archive fields, then a Usenet archive will not recognize any prohibition on archiving the message.

== Support ==
=== Archives ===
Although archives are expected to honor X-No-Archive and Archive directives, there is no technical means of enforcing compliance. When DejaNews was purchased by Google, Google continued to process X-No-Archive fields. Other newsgroup archiving services have also followed in DejaNews's footsteps, though their commitments have been entirely voluntary.

GNU Mailman suppresses archiving for any value of X-No-Archive.

Gmane suppresses archiving for Archive: no and X-No-Archive: yes.

The online service mail-archive.com supports X-No-Archive: yes.

=== News readers ===
Many popular news readers, such as Forté Agent, include, as a standard option, the ability to insert a X-No-Archive field into messages.

Mozilla Thunderbird has the ability to insert custom fields into the header of both email and Usenet messages. This feature must be manually enabled by editing its mailnews.js file. However, custom fields are not automatically inserted into messages by Thunderbird—the user must add them manually to each message as desired.

== See also ==
- Cancel message
