= Xangongo Airport =

- IATA: XGN; ICAO: FNXA

Summary
- Airport type: Public
- Serves: Xangongo
- Location: Angola
- Elevation AMSL: 3,635 ft / 1,108 m
- Coordinates: 16°45′20″S 14°57′55″E

Map
- Location of airport in Angola

Runways
Direction	Length		Surface
Direction	m	ft	Surface
03/21	2,265	7,431	Asphalt
- Sources: Landings.com Google Maps GCM

Xangongo Airport (IATA: XGN, ICAO: FNXA) is an airport near Xangongo, Angola. It was built by the Cubans in 1988 as a forward air base during the last campaign against apartheid South Africa in the Angolan Civil War.

== See also ==
- List of airports in Angola
- Transport in Angola
