= Hyperskill =

Online programming education platform

- Owner: JetBrains
- Website: hyperskill.org
- Commercial: Yes
- Registration: Required
- Launched: 2019; 7 years ago
- Current status: Active

Hyperskill (formerly known as JetBrains Academy) is an online educational platform for learning programming languages through project-based learning. It features integration with professional development environments and has been used as a subject in research related to computer science education. The platform offers courses in programming languages such as Python, Java, Kotlin, JavaScript, Go, C++, and SQL, along with foundational topics in computer science, web development, and data analysis.

== History ==
JetBrains Academy was launched publicly in 2019, initially offering free access during the COVID-19 pandemic, as reported by TechCrunch. The platform began by offering courses in Java, Python, and Kotlin through more than 60 projects that students could build themselves while receiving instant feedback through integrated development environments (IDEs).

It was developed by JetBrains, a software development company known for creating popular IDEs such as IntelliJ IDEA and PyCharm. At launch, Hyperskill functioned as the delivery platform for JetBrains Academy's educational content, with the aim of providing a structured and practical approach to programming education.

In February 2023, JetBrains announced a strategic change to its educational initiative through a blog post titled “The New Vision for JetBrains Academy”. The restructuring positioned Hyperskill as a standalone educational platform with its own branding and subscription model, while JetBrains Academy became a content provider within the Hyperskill ecosystem.

== Features and learning model ==
Hyperskill employs a project-based learning model that combines theoretical instruction with hands-on programming tasks. Learners progress through structured learning tracks that cover both fundamental and advanced topics in software development. Each track includes interactive coding exercises, theory modules, and projects that simulate real-world applications.

According to reviews on Class Central, Hyperskill’s integration with JetBrains IDEs is frequently cited as a key benefit, as it helps learners become familiar with professional development workflows. This integration is made possible through the JetBrains Academy plugin (also known as EduTools), which allows users to complete assignments directly within supported JetBrains environments.

Class Central reviewers also note that the platform follows a "learn by doing" approach, in which learners study a concept and then immediately apply it through coding exercises or by building components of larger projects. The curriculum is modular, enabling users to follow comprehensive, career-oriented tracks or to focus on individual subjects.

== Distinguishing features ==
According to academic research published in 2025, Hyperskill's integration with professional IDEs offers educational benefits, including “a more realistic setting” and access to tools such as debugging and code analysis, which are considered important for real-world software development.

The platform has also been referenced in Google's official Android developer documentation, which lists Hyperskill's Kotlin courses as a resource for additional practice in Kotlin fundamentals.

Additional features include AI-powered hints that provide contextual assistance during coding tasks, as well as a built-in community forum where users can ask questions and share insights with other learners.

== Academic recognition ==
Hyperskill has been cited in academic literature as a "popular MOOC platform" and has served as a data source for research in computer science education. A 2024 study published on arXiv analyzed Python code submissions from the platform to explore methods for clustering and presenting diverse programming solutions to students.

The platform has also been referenced in studies examining the educational benefits of in-IDE learning environments and has been described in research contexts as a "large MOOC platform".

== Subscription model ==
Hyperskill offers both free and premium subscription tiers. The free plan provides access to most learning tracks and educational content but includes limitations such as a cap on daily task submissions, limited access to hints, and no certificates for completed projects.

The premium subscription removes these restrictions and provides additional features, including unlimited task submissions and hints, access to exclusive projects, and personalized code quality feedback. Premium users also receive certificates of completion for finished projects and learning tracks.

In addition to individual plans, Hyperskill offers organizational subscriptions for teams, educational institutions, and companies. These plans include administrative tools for tracking learner progress and managing study paths across groups.

== Reception ==
Reviews on Class Central have highlighted Hyperskill's project-based learning model and integration with JetBrains IDEs as notable strengths. A 2024 review described it as "the Best Free Learning Platform for All" for Kotlin, citing high user ratings and enrollment figures. Another review praised its "engaging, interactive coding exercises" and the value of working on real-world projects.

Independent reviewers have also noted the platform's effective combination of theoretical instruction and practical application. The clarity of the curriculum and the opportunity to build portfolio-ready projects are frequently mentioned as advantages. Some reviewers have observed that the platform may be better suited for learners with prior coding experience, particularly in advanced tracks.

While formal academic evaluations of its educational effectiveness are limited, Hyperskill's use in computer science education research suggests a level of academic interest. Its project-based approach has been studied for its potential in teaching programming concepts.

== See also ==
- List of online educational resources
