= IntelliJ IDEA =

Integrated development environment

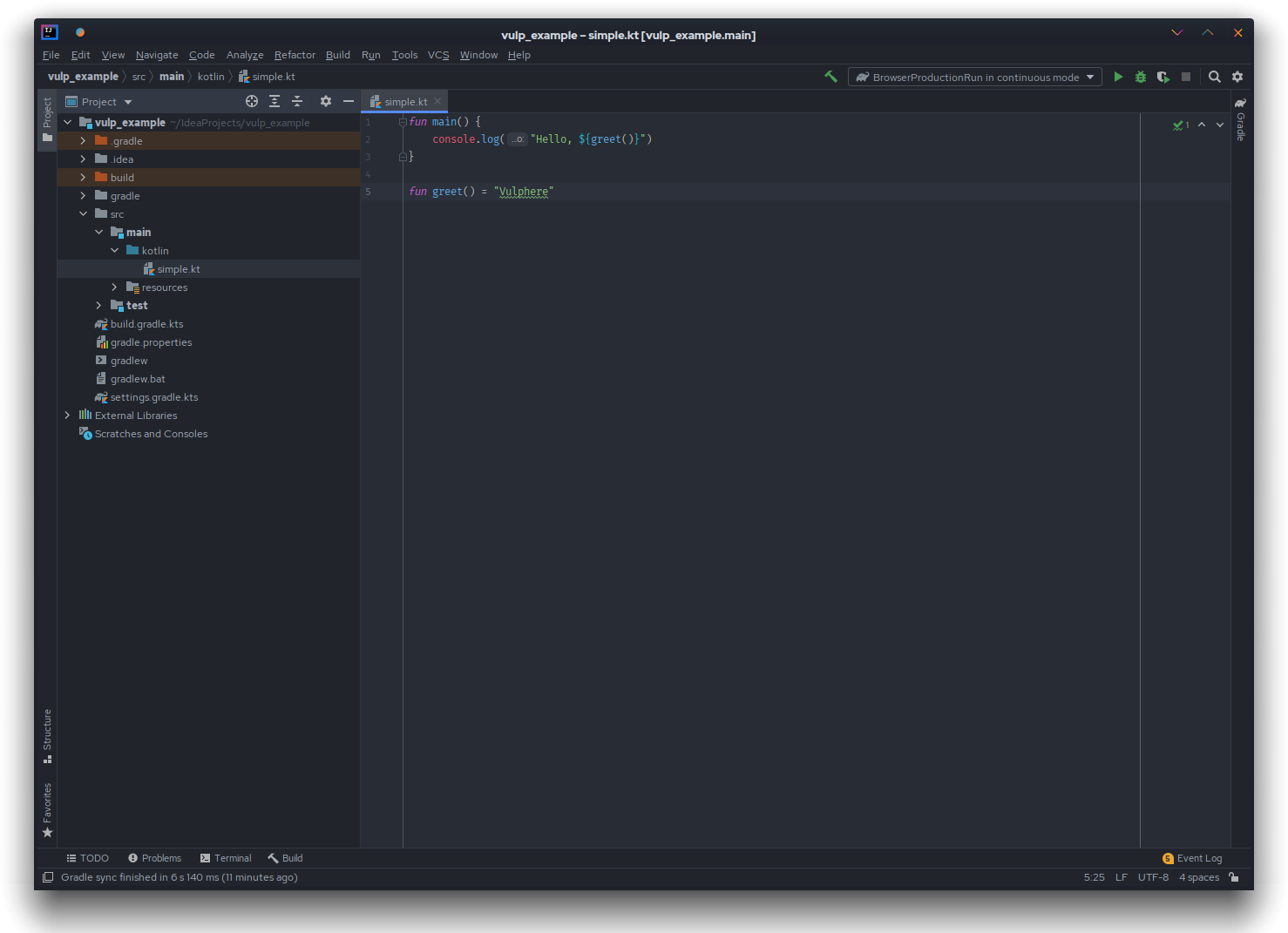
- IntelliJ IDEA 2021.1 Community Edition
- Developer: JetBrains
- Release: 1.0 / January 2001; 25 years ago
- Stable release: 2026.2.2
- Written in: Java, Kotlin
- Operating system: Windows, macOS, Linux
- Type: Java IDE
- License: Community edition: Apache License 2.0 with proprietary license for some bundled plugins; Ultimate edition: Trialware
- Website: www.jetbrains.com/idea/

IntelliJ IDEA (pronounced /ɪnˈtɛlɪdʒeɪ/ in-TEL-ih-jay "idea") is an integrated development environment (IDE) written in Java for developing computer software written in Java, Kotlin, Groovy, and other JVM-based languages. It is developed by JetBrains (formerly known as IntelliJ) and is available as an Apache 2 Licensed community edition with proprietary license for some bundled plugins, and in a proprietary commercial edition. Both can be used for commercial development.

== History ==
The first version of IntelliJ IDEA was released in January 2001 and was one of the first available Java IDEs with advanced code navigation and code refactoring capabilities integrated.

In 2009, JetBrains released the source code for IntelliJ IDEA under the open-source Apache License 2.0. JetBrains also began distributing a limited version of IntelliJ IDEA consisting of open-source features under the moniker Community Edition. The commercial Ultimate Edition provides additional features and remains available for a fee.

In a 2010 InfoWorld report, IntelliJ received the highest test centre score out of the four top Java programming tools: Eclipse, IntelliJ IDEA, NetBeans and JDeveloper.

In December 2014, Google announced version 1.0 of Android Studio, an open-source IDE for Android apps, based on the open source community edition. Other development environments based on IntelliJ's framework include AppCode, CLion, DataGrip, GoLand, PhpStorm, PyCharm, Rider, RubyMine, WebStorm, and MPS.

In September 2020, Huawei announced and released version 1.0 of DevEco Studio, an open-source IDE for HarmonyOS apps development, based on Jetbrains IntelliJ IDEA with Huawei's SmartAssist for Windows and macOS.

In September 2025, JetBrains added AI support to its IDE as a free (limited use) or a paid-for subscription service. This includes their own agent (Junie) and supporting Anthropic's Claude; other agents were already available as plug-ins.

In August 2026, JetBrains announced the preview for Java & Kotlin by IntelliJ IDEA, a Language Server Protocol–based extension which brings the code analysis, debugging, and refactoring capabilities of the IDE to Visual Studio Code and its forks (via the Open VSX repository).

== System requirements ==
System requirements for IntelliJ IDEA 2025.2
	Windows	macOS	Linux
Operating system version	64-bit Windows 10, version 1809 (or Windows Server 2019) or later	macOS Monterey or later	A Linux 6.x distribution with glibc 2.28 or later that supports GNOME, KDE
RAM	2 GB free RAM minimum; 8 GB RAM recommended		
Disk space	3.5 GB required; a solid-state drive with at least 5 GB of free space is recommended		
JDK version	JDK 7 to 25 supported		
JRE version	Bundled with Java 21		
Screen resolution	At least 1024×768 is required; at least 1920×1080 is recommended		

== Features ==
=== Coding assistance ===
The IDE provides certain features like code completion by analysing the context, code navigation which allows jumping to a class or declaration in the code directly, code refactoring, code debugging, linting and options to fix inconsistencies via suggestions.

=== Built in tools and integration ===
The IDE provides integration with build/packaging tools like Maven, Grunt, Gradle, and sbt. It supports databases like Microsoft SQL Server, Oracle, PostgreSQL, SQLite, and MySQL can be accessed directly from the IDE in the Ultimate edition, through an embedded version of DataGrip, another IDE developed by JetBrains.

=== Plugin ecosystem ===
IntelliJ IDEA supports plugins through which one can add additional functionality to the IDE. Plugins can be downloaded and installed either from IntelliJ's plugin repository website or through the IDE's built-in plugin search and install feature. Each edition has separate plugin repositories, with the Community edition supporting over 7,600 plugins, and the Ultimate edition supporting over 8,300 plugins, as of November 2024.

=== Supported languages ===
The Community and Ultimate editions differ in their support for various programming languages as shown in the following table.

Supported in both Community and Ultimate Edition:

- CSS, Sass, SCSS, Less, Stylus
- Groovy
- HTML, XML, JSON, YAML
- Java
- Kotlin
- Markdown
- XSL, XPATH

Supported in both Community and Ultimate Edition via plugins:

- Clojure
- CloudSlang
- Dart
- Elm
- Erlang
- Gosu
- Haskell
- Haxe
- Julia
- Lua
- Perl
- Python
- R
- Rust
- Scala

Supported only in Ultimate Edition:

- CoffeeScript, ActionScript
- JavaScript, TypeScript
- SQL

Supported only in Ultimate Edition via plugins:

- Cython
- Go
- PHP
- Ruby and JRuby

=== Technologies and frameworks ===
Supported in both Community and Ultimate Edition:

- Android (includes the functionality of Android Studio)
- Ant
- Gradle
- Test runners (JUnit, TestNG, Spock, Cucumber, ScalaTest, spec2, etc.)
- JavaFX
- Maven

Supported only in Ultimate Edition:

- Django
- Thymeleaf, FreeMarker, Velocity
- Grails
- Jakarta EE (Jakarta Faces, JAX-RS, CDI, JPA, etc.)
- Micronaut, Quarkus, Helidon
- Node.js, React, Vue.js, Angular
- AspectJ, JBoss Seam, OSGi
- Play
- Ruby on Rails
- sbt
- Spring

There was a free plugin from Atlassian for IntelliJ available to integrate with JIRA, Bamboo, Crucible and FishEye. However, the software, called IDE-Connector, was discontinued on June 1, 2015.

=== Software versioning and revision control ===
The two editions also differ in their support for software versioning and revision control systems.

Supported in both Community and Ultimate Edition:

- Git
- Mercurial
- Subversion
- Azure DevOps (formerly TFS/VSTS; via plug-in)

Supported only in Ultimate Edition:

- Perforce

=== Related products ===
The core engine (IntelliJ IDEA) is also included in a number of product IDEs specifically targeted at particular development environments. As of late September 2025, these included:

- IntelliJ IDEA: Java, Kotlin, Spring
- PyCharm: Python, Django, Jupyter
- PhpStorm: PHP, Laravel, Symfony
- GoLand: Go (Golang), JavaScript, TypeScript
- Rider: C#, .NET, ASP.NET
- CLion: C, C++, CMake
- RustRover: Rust, SQL, JavaScript
- WebStorm: JavaScript, TypeScript, React
- RubyMine: Ruby on Rails (RoR), Hotwire, RuboCop
- DataGrip: Databases, SQL, NoSQL
- DataSpell: Python, Jupyter, SQL cells
- ReSharper: C#, .NET, ASP.NET

== See also ==
- Comparison of integrated development environments

== Bibliography ==
- Saunders, Stephen; Fields, Duane K.; Belayev, Eugene (March 1, 2006), IntelliJ IDEA in Action (1st ed.), Manning, p. 450, ISBN 1-932394-44-3
- Davydov, S.; Efimov, A. (May 2005), IntelliJ IDEA. Professional'noe programmirovanie na Java (V podlinnike) (1st ed.), BHV, p. 800, ISBN 5-94157-607-2, archived from the original on 2013-12-09
