= Project team =

Cross-functional team formed to complete a specific project

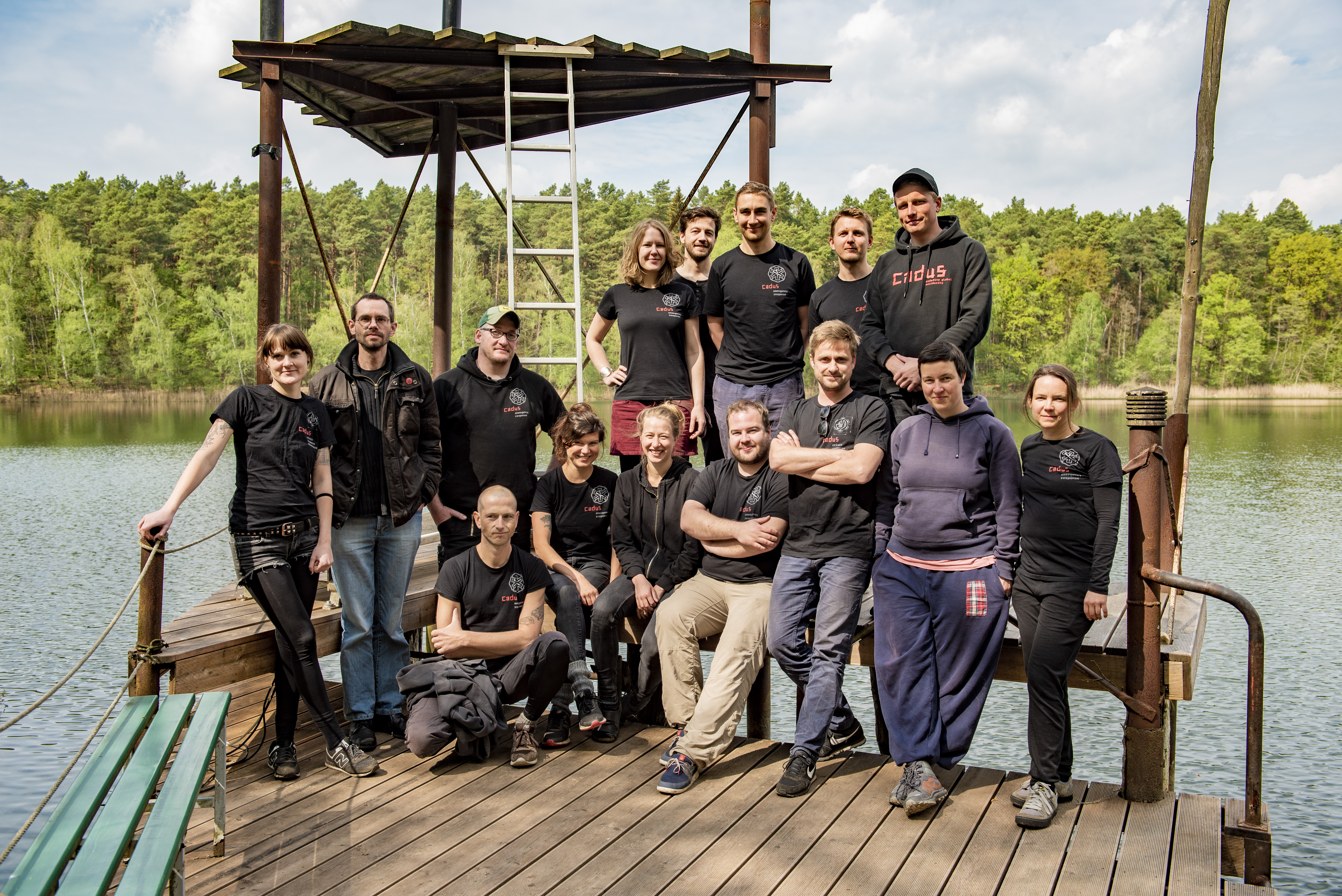
A team collaborating training 2019

In a project, a project team or team is defined as "an interdependent collection of individuals who work together towards a common goal and who share responsibility for specific outcomes of their organizations". An additional requirement to the original definition is that "the team is identified as such by those within and outside of the team". As project teams work on specific projects, the first requirement is usually met. In the early stages of a project, the project team may not be recognized as a team, leading to some confusion within the organization. The central characteristic of project teams in modern organizations is the autonomy and flexibility availed in the process or method undertaken to meet their goals.

Most project teams require involvement from more than one department, therefore most project teams can be classified as cross-functional teams. The project team usually consists of a variety of members often working under the direction of a project manager or of a senior member of the organization. Projects that may not receive strong support initially often have the backing of a project champion. Individual team-members can either be involved on a part-time or full-time basis. Their time commitment can change throughout the project depending on the project development stage.

Project teams need to have the right combination of skills, abilities and personality types to achieve collaborative tension. Teams can be formulated in a variety of ways. The most common method is at the discretion of a senior member of the organization.

There are many components to becoming a top-performing team, but the key is working on highly cooperative relationship. The job of management is to foster a relaxed and comfortable atmosphere where members can be themselves and are engaged and invested in the project work. All team members are encouraged for relationship building. Each member is responsible to give constructive feedback, recognize, value and utilize unique strengths of each other. The whole team is tuned trust and cooperation.

== See also ==
- Resource calendar
- Resource allocation
- Programming team
