= Egoless programming =

Computer development technique

Egoless programming is a style of computer programming in which personal factors are minimized so that quality may be improved. The cooperative methods suggested are similar to those used by other collective ventures such as Wikipedia.

== History ==
The concept was first propounded by Gerald M. Weinberg in his 1971 book, The Psychology of Computer Programming.

== Peer reviews of code ==
To ensure quality, reviews of code by other programmers are made. The concept of egoless programming emphasises that such reviews should be made in a friendly, collegial way in which personal feelings are put aside. Structured walkthroughs are one way of making such a formal review.

== Strengths ==
- Works best for complex tasks. ('difficult' used in)
- Open communication channels allow information to flow freely to team members
- Greater conformity that helps in consistent documentation
- Team members have greater job satisfaction.

== Weaknesses ==
- Projects take longer to complete.
- Projects experience a higher failure rate due to the decentralized nature of and volume of communication between members of the team.
- Risky shift phenomenon – Programmers attempt riskier solutions to solve a software problem.
- Simple tasks are made more difficult by open communication channels.

Note: The single paper cited for 'Strengths & Weaknesses' is from 1981 and says in its conclusions:

Most of the research on group problem-solving behavior was conducted in a laboratory setting with students and tasks of short duration.

None of these task/structure recommendations have been tested in a software development environment.

== Rival concepts ==
Egoless programming explicitly minimizes constraints of hierarchy and status so as to enable the free exchange of ideas and improvements. It may be contrasted with the chief programmer team concept which emphasises specialisation and leadership in teams so that they work in a more disciplined way.

== See also ==
- List of software development philosophies
- Software review
- Egolessness
