= EuroSTAR Conference =

The EuroSTAR Conference is the largest gathering of European software testing professionals. The 2026 EuroSTAR Software Testing Conference will take place at Oslo, Norway, 15-18 June 2026.

== History of EuroSTAR Software Testing ==
The first EuroSTAR conference took place in London in October 1993 as a sister conference of (US-based) STAR Conferences organised by William C. Hetzel and Gelperin in conjunction with the British Computer Society.

EuroSTAR stands for European Software Testing Analysis & Review.

EuroSTAR is the longest running and largest European software testing and quality assurance conference that takes place in a different European city each year.

Examples include the United Kingdom, Edinburgh (2025), Sweden (Stockholm in 2024), Belgium (Antwerp in 2023), Denmark (Copenhagen in 2022), and Norway (Oslo scheduled for 2026).

== Other ==
The annual conference has been the origin of many milestones in the history of software testing including the introduction of the W-Model by Paul Herzlich in 1993, the foundation of Dutch Special Interest Group in Software Testing (SIGIST) TestNet at EuroSTAR 1996 and the foundation of the Test Lab (2009) which has since become a focal point at many international conferences on software testing. Proceedings at EuroSTAR have been cited in many publications on software testing and the conference is regularly featured on international software testing conference lists and IT journals.

== EuroSTAR Testing Excellence Award ==
The EuroSTAR European Testing Excellence Award has been awarded at the annual EuroSTAR Conference since 1998. The award seeks to recognise significant contributions to the field of software testing in Europe. Gerald Weinberg. is a past winner of the award.
