= Valentin Kipyatkov =

Russian billionaire

Valentin Kipyatkov (born June 5, 1976) is a Russian billionaire. He made his fortune from the software firm JetBrains, co-founded with Sergey Dmitriev. He resides primarily in Cyprus. He graduated from Saint Petersburg State University.

== Biography ==
In 1988, he graduated from the Faculty of Mathematics and Mechanics at Saint Petersburg State University.

In the late 1990s, he worked at the Saint Petersburg-based company TogetherSoft.

In 1999, he moved from Saint Petersburg to Prague to work at the Prague branch of TogetherSoft.

In 2000, together with Sergey Dmitriev and Yevgeny Belyaev, he co-founded JetBrains, with its first office located in a rented apartment in Prague.

In 2023, JetBrains fully exited the Russian market and sold off its real estate. In December, the last office properties were purchased by the DIY company "Petrovich". Earlier, in 2022, the Universe business center in Saint Petersburg had been sold to the company "Sterkh".

== Net Worth ==
He was included in Forbes magazine’s 2022 list of "88 Russian Billionaires," ranking 34th with a net worth of $2.9 billion.

== Personal Life and Hobbies ==
As of 2015, he continued to live in Saint Petersburg.

He is also a recreational pilot.
