= JetBrains =

Czech software company

- Type: Private
- Industry: Software
- Founded: February 2000; 26 years ago in Prague, Czech Republic
- Founders: Sergey Dmitriev; Valentin Kipyatkov; Eugene Belyaev
- Headquarters: Amsterdam, Netherlands
- Key people: Kirill Skrygan (CEO)
- Number of employees: 2,800+ (2026)
- Website: jetbrains.com

JetBrains is a multinational software company founded in Prague in 2000 and headquartered in Amsterdam. It develops integrated development environments (IDEs), including IntelliJ IDEA, PyCharm, WebStorm and Rider. Its IntelliJ Platform also forms the basis of Android Studio, Google's official IDE for Android development.

JetBrains created the Kotlin programming language, which is widely used for Android development. Its other products include TeamCity for continuous integration, YouTrack for project management, and AI-assisted coding tools such as Junie.

== History ==
JetBrains logo used from 2005 to 2016

JetBrains logo used since 2016

JetBrains, initially named IntelliJ Software, was founded in 2000 in Prague by three Russian software developers: Sergey Dmitriev, Valentin Kipyatkov and Eugene Belyaev. The company's first product was IntelliJ Renamer, a tool for code refactoring in Java.

In 2012 CEO Sergey Dmitriev was replaced by Oleg Stepanov and Maxim Shafirov.

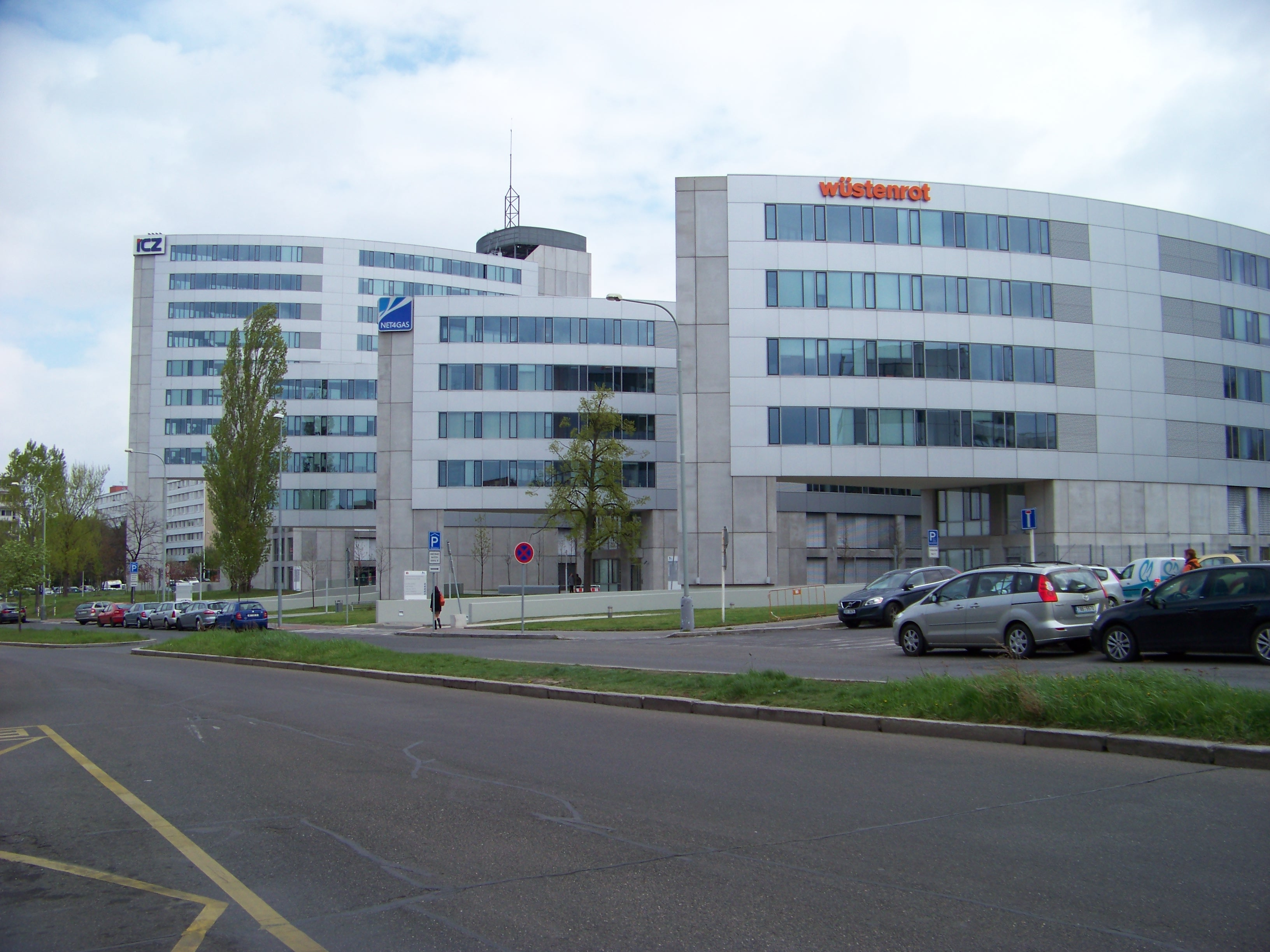
Kavčí Hory Office Park on Na hřebenech II in Prague, Czech Republic (address associated with JetBrains s.r.o.).

In 2021 The New York Times stated that unknown parties might have embedded malware in JetBrains' TeamCity CI/CD software that led to the SolarWinds hack and other widespread security compromises. In a press release, JetBrains said they had not been contacted by any government or security agency and had not "taken part or been involved in this attack in any way". The CEO of one of the affected companies, SolarWinds, "asked about the possibility that software tools made by JetBrains, which speeds the development and testing of code, was the pathway".

In response to the 2022 Russian invasion of Ukraine, the company suspended sales and R&D activities in Russia indefinitely, and sales in Belarus. JetBrains' Russian legal entity was liquidated on 21 February 2023.

In September 2023, JetBrains acquired the company Code Buddy and its two main products, JPA Buddy and React Buddy. The tools were integrated into IntelliJ IDEA Ultimate and the team joined JetBrains to continue their development.

Effective 1 February 2024, Kirill Skrygan replaced Maxim Shafirov as CEO.

In December 2025, JetBrains unified IntelliJ IDEA into a single distribution, merging the previously separate Community Edition and Ultimate Edition. Under the new model, all Ultimate features require a subscription to unlock, while the IDE remains fully functional and free for both commercial and non-commercial projects without a subscription, including more features than the Community Edition previously offered.

== Financial performance ==
JetBrains has achieved significant financial growth without external funding. The company reported 5.6% revenue growth in 2023, following 11% growth in 2022. JetBrains is profitable with $200 million in EBITDA generated in 2020. The company has never raised external capital.

== Products ==
=== IDEs ===
==== Current ====
The following is a non-exhaustive list of integrated development environments (IDEs) distributed by JetBrains.

Name	Description
Android Studio	Made in cooperation with Google for the Android programming tools.
CLion	CLion (pronounced "sea lion") is a C and C++ IDE for Linux, macOS, and Windows integrated with the CMake build system. The initial version supports GNU Compiler Collection (GCC) and Clang compilers and GDB debugger, LLDB and Google Test.
DataGrip	A database administration tool for SQL databases. Other data stores are also accessible via plugin functionality.
DataSpell Deprecated (May 2026)	A data science tool for Jupyter Notebooks and Python.
GoLand	For Go development. It features tooling for SQL and DevOps-oriented tasks, and basic web toolchain support (TS/JS).
IntelliJ IDEA	For Java virtual machine–based languages such as Java, Groovy, Kotlin, and Scala. An open-source version is available under the name IntelliJ IDEA Community Edition, and a proprietary version as IntelliJ IDEA Ultimate Edition.
PhpStorm	For PHP.
PyCharm	For Python. An open-source version is available as PyCharm Community Edition, and a proprietary version as PyCharm Professional Edition. For students, JetBrains has also developed PyCharm Education.
Rider	For .NET (primarily C# and F#) development and game development with Unity (C#) and Unreal Engine (C++)
RubyMine	For Ruby and Ruby on Rails.
RustRover	For Rust (also for Embedded Rust development). It also possesses tooling for TypeScript/JavaScript and SQL.
WebStorm	For web, JavaScript and TypeScript development. Many of JetBrains's other IDEs include the feature set of WebStorm via plugins.

==== Former ====
Name	Description
AppCode	Supports programming in C, C++, Objective-C and Swift. Unlike most JetBrains products, which are cross-platform, AppCode is only available for macOS. JetBrains announced that AppCode is being sunsetted, but received technical support until 31 December 2023.
Aqua	A test automation IDE that supports unit tests, UI tests and API tests. It was discontinued in 2025.
Fleet	Multi-purpose IDE, with support for collaboration and remote workflows. It was officially discontinued in 2025.
Writerside	Technical writing IDE. It was discontinued in 2025

The JetBrains Marketplace offers 8,860 plugins that extend the functionality of JetBrains IDEs.

==== ReSharper ====
ReSharper is a Visual Studio extension for .NET developers, first released in 2004. It is JetBrains' longest-standing commercial product and, according to JetBrains, has accumulated over 2.5 million downloads, making it the most popular extension on the Visual Studio Marketplace. It was also a key revenue source for JetBrains in its early years.

ReSharper provides on-the-fly code quality analysis for C#, VB.NET, XAML, ASP.NET, JavaScript, TypeScript, CSS, HTML, and XML. Its features include code refactoring, code completion, navigation, find usages, and code formatting. The extension offers more than 2,200 on-the-fly code inspections and over 60 refactorings and 450 context actions.

Starting with version 2026.1, ReSharper expanded beyond Visual Studio to support Visual Studio Code and compatible editors such as Cursor, bringing JetBrains' C# tooling to a broader range of development environments. The VS Code extension provides real-time code analysis, refactorings, and navigation for C#, XAML, Razor, and Blazor, and includes a Solution Explorer and built-in unit testing support for NUnit, xUnit.net, and MSTest.

ReSharper's development influenced the creation of JetBrains' standalone .NET IDE, Rider; although plans for a dedicated ReSharper IDE were explored and later abandoned after the release of Visual Studio 2005, the work done on ReSharper ultimately formed the foundation for Rider. ReSharper is available as a standalone license or as part of the dotUltimate subscription, which also includes Rider, dotTrace, dotCover, and dotMemory.

=== Programming languages ===
The Kotlin programming language logo, developed by JetBrains in 2011

Kotlin is an open-source, statically typed programming language that runs on the Java virtual machine and also compiles to JavaScript or native code (via LLVM). The name comes from the Kotlin Island, near St. Petersburg. In May 2017, Google announced first-class support for Kotlin on Android, and at Google I/O 2019, Google declared Kotlin its preferred language for Android app development.

JetBrains MPS is an open-source language workbench for domain-specific languages.

Ktor is a Kotlin-based programming framework for developing "connected applications", using the same framework on both server (JVM) and client (JavaScript, Android, and iOS).

Kotlin Multiplatform (KMP) is a JetBrains technology that allows developers to share Kotlin code across multiple platforms, including Android, iOS, desktop, web, and server. It reached stable status with the release of Kotlin 1.9.20 in November 2023. The related Compose Multiplatform framework, which enables shared user interfaces, became stable for iOS in 2025.

=== Team tools ===
Logo of JetBrains' TeamCity continuous integration and delivery server

TeamCity is a continuous integration and continuous delivery server developed by JetBrains. It is a server-based web application written in Java. The New York Times reported that TeamCity may have been used by Russian hackers of US governmental and private agencies, in potentially "the biggest breach of United States networks in history".

Upsource was a code review and repository browsing tool supporting Git, GitHub, Mercurial, Perforce and/or Subversion repositories from a central location. JetBrains released a new developer collaboration tool, Space, in 2019. It began sunsetting Upsource in 2022, officially ending support for the product in January 2023. In May 2024, JetBrains rebranded Space to SpaceCode to focus on Git hosting and code reviews.

YouTrack is a proprietary, commercial web-based bug tracker, issue tracking system, and project management software developed by JetBrains.

Qodana is a code quality analysis tool that uses static code analysis to help users with code reviews, building quality gates, and the implementation of code quality guidelines. It was publicly launched in July 2023 and can be used with IDEs in JetBrains's ecosystem, has CI/CD pipeline integration, while supporting code analysis in over 60 programming languages.

=== AI tools ===
JetBrains AI Assistant is offered in most JetBrains IDEs as a set of AI-assisted software development tools. The assistant uses models from OpenAI and Google, and proprietary models developed by JetBrains, such as the Mellum model released in April 2025.

Junie is an AI coding agent developed by JetBrains, launched in January 2025 in closed preview. Unlike the AI Assistant, which focuses on code completion, Junie is designed to function as an AI agent for coding. In April 2025, JetBrains made Junie generally available.

=== Others ===
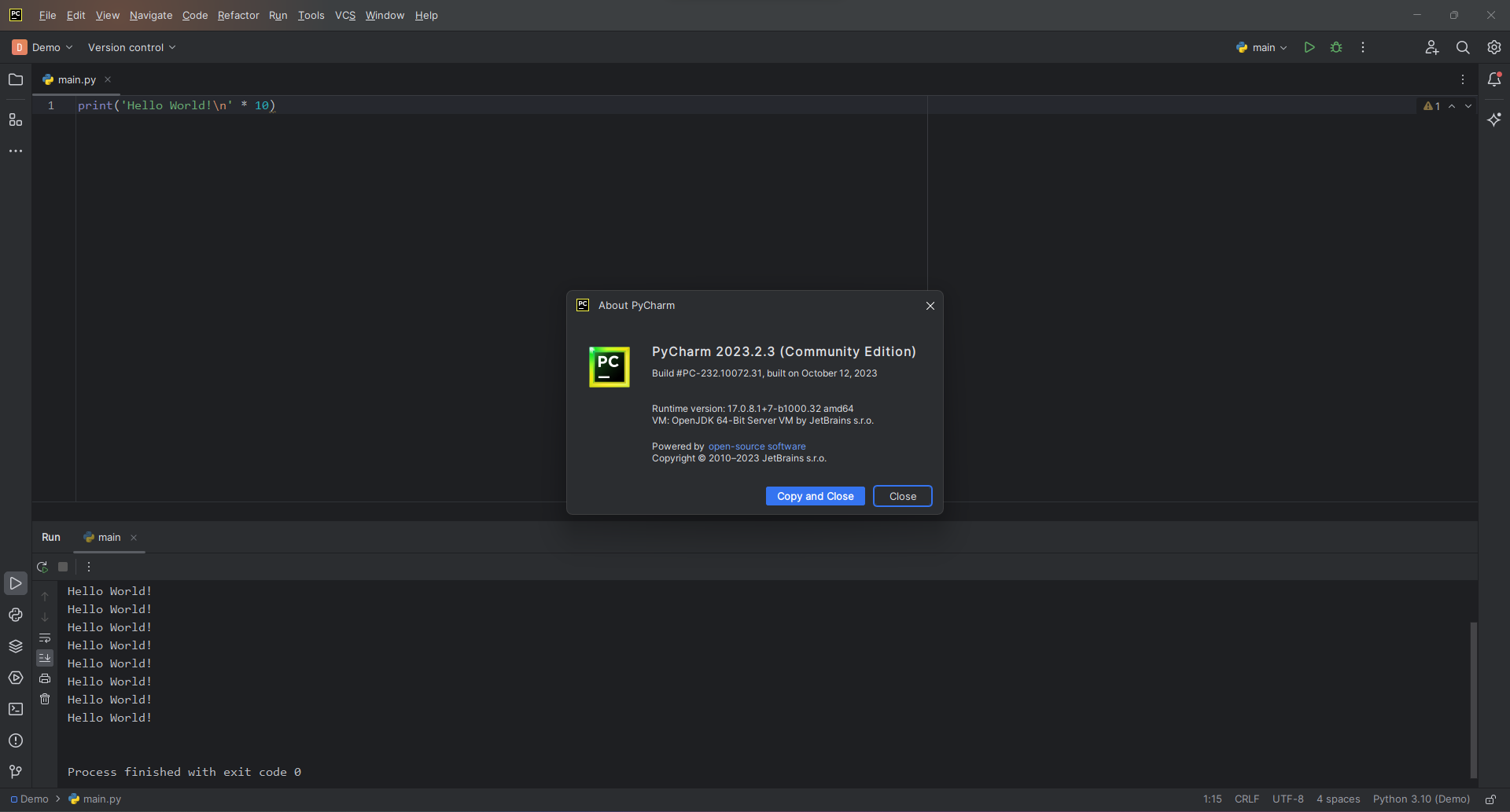
Screenshot of PyCharm 2023.2.3, JetBrains' integrated development environment for the Python programming language

Datalore is a web application for data analysis and visualization, which is focused specifically on the machine learning environment in Python. JetBrains Academy is an online platform to learn programming, including such programming languages as Python, Java, and Kotlin. The Academy was introduced by JetBrains in 2019, and reached 200,000 users by July 2020. Certifications were added in November 2021 after community feedback prioritized verifiability of the work done on projects. JetBrains has also developed the EduTools plugin for students, which is compatible with IntelliJ IDEA (Ultimate, Community, Educational), Android Studio, CLion, GoLand, PhpStorm, PyCharm (Professional, Community, Educational), WebStorm.

=== Open source projects ===
Kotlin code in IntelliJ IDEA, showing inline parameter hints for constructor calls. JetBrains develops both the language and its primary IDE tooling.

In 2009, JetBrains open-sourced the core functionality of IntelliJ IDEA by offering the free Community Edition. It is built on the IntelliJ Platform and includes its sources. JetBrains released both under Apache License 2.0. In 2010, Android support became a part of the Community Edition, and two years later Google announced its Android Studio, the IDE for mobile development on Android platform built on the Community Edition of IntelliJ IDEA and an official alternative to Eclipse Android Developer Tool. After two years of development JetBrains open-sourced Kotlin in February 2012. In June 2015, it was announced that the support of Eclipse ADT would be discontinued, making Android Studio the official tool for Android App development.

==== JetBrains Mono ====
Jetbrains Mono font sample

In January 2020, JetBrains released a geometric monospaced font named JetBrains Mono, made the default font for its IDEs, under the Apache License 2.0. The font is designed for reading source code by being optimized for reading vertically with support for programming ligatures.

== Financials and business model ==
As a private company, JetBrains does not disclose detailed financial statements. However, its annual highlight reports indicate consistent growth. In its 2023 highlights, the company reported a 5.6% year-over-year revenue growth and noted 11.4 million recurring active users. This followed an 11% revenue growth in 2022, when the company reported having 15.9 million users.

The company's business model is primarily based on software subscriptions. In recent years, JetBrains has adjusted its model in response to market trends. This includes making more of its IDEs available with free, non-commercial licenses, such as for RustRover, and unifying its flagship IDE, IntelliJ IDEA, to offer a single download with both free and paid features.

== Partnerships ==
JetBrains maintains partnerships with more than 140 resellers and numerous technology partners worldwide. According to partnership data, JetBrains has 49 partners, including 41 technology partners and 8 channel partners, with Salesforce as its largest partner.

=== Google Cloud ===
JetBrains has an active technology partnership with Google Cloud. In 2022, the companies partnered to deliver integration between Google Cloud Workstations and JetBrains remote development, allowing developers to use JetBrains IDEs with Google Cloud's managed development environments. This integration gave Cloud Workstations support for popular JetBrains IDEs such as IntelliJ IDEA, PyCharm, and Rider, allowing developers to take advantage of managed and customizable environments in Google Cloud within their preferred IDE.

In 2024, JetBrains extended its collaboration with Google Cloud to integrate Google's Gemini models into JetBrains AI Assistant, making it the first tool of its kind to combine functionality from OpenAI's GPT-4o, Gemini, and JetBrains' proprietary models. The collaboration leveraged Google Cloud's Vertex AI to expand the pool of large language models (LLMs) available to AI Assistant users, with Gemini Pro 1.5 and Flash 1.5 adding a long context window, advanced reasoning, and high-volume, low-latency capabilities. With JetBrains AI Enterprise, organisations were given the ability to configure which LLM their teams use, while for other users the assistant automatically selects the most suitable model for each task. Later that year, starting from version 2024.3 of JetBrains AI Assistant, users were able to select their preferred LLM directly within the AI chat interface.

The partnership further expanded in 2025, when JetBrains integrated Gemini 3 Pro into both its AI Assistant and its AI coding agent Junie, with JetBrains noting that the new model showed more than a 50% improvement over Gemini 2.5 Pro in solved benchmark tasks. Google Cloud also made Gemini Code Assist available as a plugin for JetBrains IDEs, supporting real-time code completions, full-function generation, and natural-language-to-code conversion within the JetBrains ecosystem.

=== Other collaborations ===
JetBrains participates in various strategic collaborations, including the Java Community Process Executive Committee, Kotlin Foundation, and supports JUnit 5. The company also partners with Unity for RiderFlow and GitLab to optimize review experiences.

== Community and education initiatives ==
JetBrains provides extensive support to educational institutions and the developer community. In 2024, 1,840,580 students and 94,041 teachers benefited from complimentary JetBrains educational packs, while 954,277 students received special discounts for license renewal upon graduation. Additionally, 2,172 schools and universities received 190,459 educational subscriptions for classroom assistance, and 26,100 students from 596 training courses and boot camps received free subscriptions.

The company supports the open source community with 5,952 projects receiving 11,364 complimentary licenses. Through the User Group Support Program, 611 tech communities from 89 countries and regions obtained 3,916 licenses. The Developer Recognition Program honored 1,284 community experts with complimentary All Products Pack subscriptions. Additionally, 12,615 customers benefited from the Startup discount, and JetBrains sponsored 155 IT events.

JetBrains conducts annual Developer Ecosystem surveys to understand industry trends. The 2024 survey was based on input from 23,262 developers and provides insights into programming language usage, development practices, and industry trends.

=== Educational and research projects ===
Before the Russian invasion of Ukraine started - between 2012 and 2021 - the company ran and supported several educational and research projects in Russia, often in partnership with universities and other organizations, including:

- The Computer Science Club at the St. Petersburg Department of Steklov Mathematical Institute of the Russian Academy of Sciences, which is a joint initiative of JetBrains and the Yandex School of Data Analysis.
- The JetBrains Laboratory at Saint Petersburg State University.
- The BioLabs Laboratory, a consortium of scientific teams under JetBrains Research.
- A Laboratory of Mobile Robot Algorithms.

== See also ==
- GitHub Copilot
- Hyperskill – online platform by JetBrains for computer programming in Python, Java, Kotlin, JavaScript, Go, C++, and SQL.
- List of AI-assisted software development tools
- List of integrated development environments
- Visual Assist
