= Cleanroom software engineering =

Software design methodology

The cleanroom software engineering process is a software development process intended to produce software with a certifiable level of reliability. The central principles are software development based on formal methods, incremental implementation under statistical quality control, and statistically sound testing.

== History ==
The cleanroom process was originally developed by Harlan Mills and several of his colleagues including Alan Hevner at IBM.

The cleanroom process first saw use in the mid to late 1980s. Demonstration projects within the military began in the early 1990s. Recent work on the cleanroom process has examined fusing cleanroom with the automated verification capabilities provided by specifications expressed in CSP.

== Philosophy ==
The focus of the cleanroom process is on defect prevention rather than defect removal. The name "cleanroom" was chosen to evoke the cleanrooms used in the electronics industry to prevent the introduction of defects during the fabrication of semiconductors.

== Central principles ==
The basic principles of the cleanroom process are

Software development based on formal methods
Software tool support based on some mathematical formalism includes model checking, process algebras, and Petri nets. The Box Structure Method might be one such means of specifying and designing a software product. Verification that the design correctly implements the specification is performed through team review, often with software tool support.

Incremental implementation under statistical quality control
Cleanroom development uses an iterative approach, in which the product is developed in increments that gradually increase the implemented functionality. The quality of each increment is measured against pre-established standards to verify that the development process is proceeding acceptably. A failure to meet quality standards results in the cessation of testing for the current increment and a return to the design phase.

Statistically sound testing
Software testing in the cleanroom process is carried out as a statistical experiment. Based on the formal specification, a representative subset of software input/output trajectories is selected and tested. This sample is then statistically analyzed to produce an estimate of the reliability of the software and a level of confidence in that estimate.
