= Kotlin Multiplatform =

Cross-platform development technology

- Developer: JetBrains
- Release: 2017
- Written in: Kotlin
- Platform: Android, iOS, macOS, Windows, Linux, Web
- License: Apache License 2.0
- Website: kotlinlang.org/multiplatform/

Kotlin Multiplatform (KMP) is an open-source cross-platform development technology created by JetBrains that enables developers to share code across multiple platforms, including Android, iOS, desktop, web, and server environments, while retaining native programming capabilities.

It is designed to allow selective code sharing, particularly for business logic, networking, and data layers, while platform-specific code can be written natively. An associated UI framework, Compose Multiplatform, provides tools for sharing user interfaces across platforms.

== History ==
Kotlin Multiplatform was first introduced by JetBrains at KotlinConf 2017 as "Kotlin Multiplatform Projects" and released experimentally with Kotlin 1.2.

Initially supporting JVM and JavaScript targets, the platform later expanded to include native targets via Kotlin/Native. The mobile-focused term "Kotlin Multiplatform Mobile" (KMM) was later deprecated in favor of the broader term Kotlin Multiplatform.

In November 2023, JetBrains announced that Kotlin Multiplatform had reached stable status and was production-ready.

In May 2025, Compose Multiplatform, the declarative user interface framework used with Kotlin Multiplatform, reached stable status for iOS.

== Platform support ==
Kotlin Multiplatform supports development for multiple platforms, including:

- Android
- iOS
- macOS
- watchOS
- tvOS
- Windows
- Linux
- Web (via JavaScript and WebAssembly)

Developers can reuse common code across these platforms while maintaining access to platform-specific APIs.

In May 2024, Google announced official support for Kotlin Multiplatform for Android development, particularly for sharing business logic across Android and iOS applications.

== Development model ==
Kotlin Multiplatform uses a modular architecture in which shared code is placed in common modules, while platform-specific implementations are written in separate modules. This allows developers to gradually adopt the technology without rewriting entire applications.

The framework emphasizes interoperability with existing ecosystems, enabling integration with native languages such as Objective-C, Java, and JavaScript.

JetBrains also provides Compose Multiplatform as an open-source declarative UI framework for building cross-platform user interfaces using Kotlin. Based on Jetpack Compose, the framework allows developers to implement a shared UI code architecture across multiple platforms, including Android, iOS, web, and desktop environments.

== See also ==
- Kotlin (programming language)
