= Resource calendar =

The resource calendar is the timetable that shows how material and labor are consumed during the course of a project. This data might be at activity or project level.

== Project schedule ==
Making a schedule relies on upon knowledge of every individual's accessibility and schedule limits, including:

- Time zones
- Work hours
- Get-away time

== See also ==
- Schedule (project management)
- Project planning
- Resource allocation
