= PyCharm =

Python programming integrated development environment

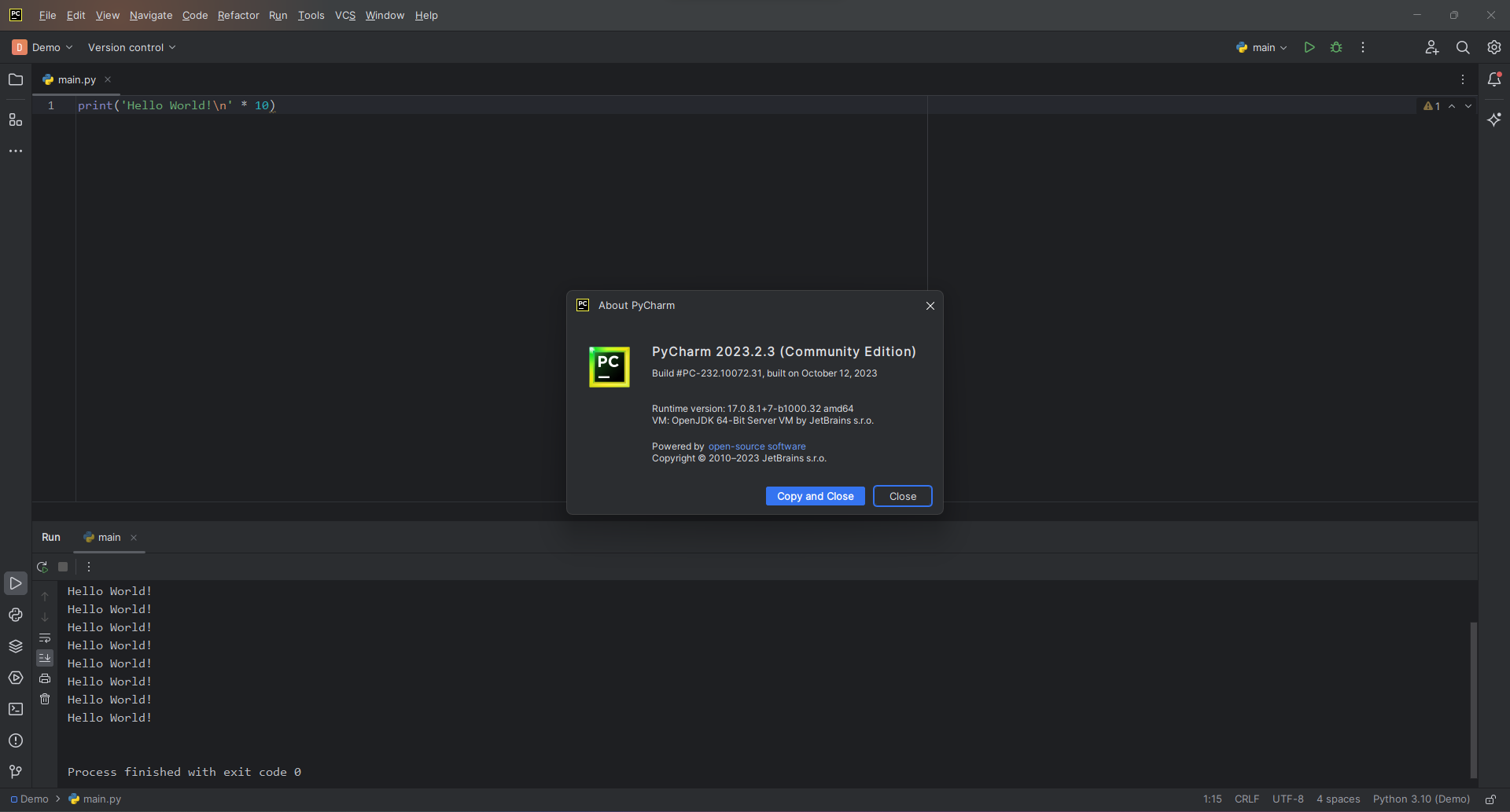
- PyCharm 2023.2 Community Edition
- Developer: JetBrains
- Release: 3 February 2010; 16 years ago
- Stable release: 2025.3.2.1 / 2 February 2026; 8 months ago
- Written in: Java, Python
- Operating system: Windows, macOS, Linux
- Size: 0.87–1.3 GB
- Type: Python IDE
- License: Community edition: Apache License 2.0; Professional edition: Trialware
- Website: www.jetbrains.com/pycharm/

PyCharm Edu
- Developer: JetBrains
- Release: 30 October 2014; 11 years ago
- Final release: 2022.2.5 (Build: 222.4554.11) / 16 March 2023; 3 years ago
- Written in: Java, Python
- Operating system: Windows, macOS, Linux
- Size: 320–430 MB
- Type: IDE
- License: Apache License 2.0
- Website: www.jetbrains.com/pycharm-edu/

PyCharm is an integrated development environment (IDE) used for programming in Python. It provides code analysis, a graphical debugger, an integrated unit tester, integration with version control systems, and supports web development with Django. PyCharm is developed by the Czech company JetBrains and built on their IntelliJ platform.

PyCharm is cross-platform, working on Microsoft Windows, macOS, and Linux. Portions of PyCharm's source code are released under the Apache License and available on GitHub, and a subscription is available to gain access to proprietary features.

== Features ==
=== Free version ===
- Python coding assistance and analysis, with code completion, syntax and error highlighting, linter integration, and quick fixes
- Project and code navigation: specialized project views, file structure views and quick jumping between files, classes, methods and usages
- Python code refactoring: including rename, update function signature, extract method, introduce variable, introduce constant, pull up, push down and others
- Integrated Python debugger
- Integrated unit testing, with line-by-line coverage
- Virtual environment, build tool and package management
- Embedded terminal and Python console
- Docker support
- HTML, XML, JSON, YAML, Markdown support
- Spell- and grammar-checking
- Version control integration: unified user interface for Mercurial, Git, Subversion, Perforce and CVS with changelists and merge, integration with GitHub and GitLab hosting services

=== Paid version ===
- Scientific tools integration: integrates with Jupyter Notebook, supports Anaconda as well as multiple scientific packages including Matplotlib and NumPy.
- Front-end and back-end web development: special support for Django, Flask, FastAPI and Pyramid, CSS and JavaScript assistance, Npm, Webpack and other JavaScript tools
- SQL and database utilities
- Cython support

== History ==
PyCharm was released to the market of the Python-focused IDEs to compete with PyDev (for Eclipse) or the more broadly focused Komodo IDE by ActiveState.

The beta version of the product was released in July 2010, with the 1.0 arriving 3 months later. Version 2.0 was released on December 13, 2011, version 3.0 was released on September 24, 2013, and version 4.0 was released on November 19, 2014.

PyCharm became open source on October 22, 2013. The open source variant is released under the name Community Edition while the commercial variant, Professional Edition, contains closed-source modules.

As of December 2022, JetBrains has discontinued PyCharm Edu and IntelliJ IDEA Edu. The educational functionality is now bundled with the Community and Professional editions of IntelliJ IDEA and PyCharm. Users are encouraged to install the Community or Professional editions and enable educational features through the IDE settings.

In April 2025, PyCharm Professional Edition and PyCharm Community Edition were merged into a "unified product", now simply called PyCharm. The new version of PyCharm can be used free of charge, with a licensing fee available to gain access to features previously exclusive to the Professional Edition.

== Licensing ==
Portions of PyCharm's source code are distributed under the Apache 2 license. The source code is available on GitHub. A Pro subscription can be purchased to gain access to additional features, primarily geared towards a faster workflow and machine learning tools; however, the core IDE can be used free of charge.

== Limitations ==
The PyCharm Python IDE does not feature a GUI builder for now. While there is no native GUI builder provided within PyCharm, by using PySide6/PyQt6 (the Python bindings to Qt V6), one can gain access to the Qt Widget Designer graphical UI builder.

== See also ==
- Comparison of Python integrated development environments
- List of Python software
