= Open VSX =

Alternative extension registry for Visual Studio Code

- Original author: TypeFox
- Developer: Eclipse Foundation
- Release: 2019
- License: Eclipse Public License 2.0
- Website: https://open-vsx.org
- Repository: github.com/eclipse-openvsx/openvsx

Open VSX is an open-source registry for extensions compatible with the Visual Studio Code extension API. The project is hosted by the Eclipse Foundation and provides a vendor-neutral alternative to Microsoft's Visual Studio Marketplace, whose licensing terms restrict usage to Microsoft products. The public registry allows extensions to be published and consumed by development environments implementing the VS Code extension model.

The project originated at the German software company TypeFox and was contributed to the Eclipse Foundation in 2020. By the mid-2020s, the registry hosted more than 10,000 extensions and served hundreds of millions of extension downloads per month.

== History ==
Open VSX was created in 2019 by TypeFox to support the Eclipse Theia development platform. The registry was developed as an alternative to Microsoft's Visual Studio Marketplace which restricts use of its extensions to Microsoft-branded tools.

In 2020, TypeFox contributed the project to the Eclipse Foundation, where it became part of the foundation's ecosystem of open-source developer tools. The public registry hosted by the Eclipse Foundation was subsequently launched at open-vsx.org.

== Governance ==
Open VSX is governed by the Open VSX Working Group at the Eclipse Foundation. The working group was established in 2023 to support vendor-neutral governance and long-term sustainability of the registry.

Founding members include Google, Salesforce, Amazon Europe, Huawei, Posit Software and Siemens.

== Usage ==
Open VSX provides infrastructure for publishing and distributing extensions compatible with the Visual Studio Code extension API. It is used by development environments that implement the VS Code extension model, including open-source platforms such as Eclipse Theia.

Industry reporting has described the registry as part of a broader ecosystem shift toward vendor-neutral tooling for software development platforms.

By 2026, the registry handled more than 50 million requests per day and hosted over 10,000 extensions from thousands of publishers.

== Managed Registry ==
In April 2026, the Eclipse Foundation launched Open VSX Managed Registry, a hosted service based on the Open VSX registry. The service was introduced to provide organizations with a managed deployment of Open VSX while maintaining compatibility with the project's open source software and governance model. Launch participants included AWS, Google, and Cursor.

In an article for The New Stack, Adrian Bridgwater described the technology as "the open source community's first foundation-operated managed service for critical developer infrastructure."

== Security ==
In 2025, a vulnerability affecting the Open VSX registry exposed repositories to potential takeover attacks, prompting security updates by project maintainers.

In 2026, researchers identified malicious extensions distributed through the registry as part of a software supply chain attack campaign, highlighting the risks associated with extension ecosystems.

Following these disclosures, maintainers implemented additional security measures, including enhanced publisher verification, credential management improvements, and extension scanning capabilities.

== Architecture ==
The Open VSX registry includes a backend service, a web interface for browsing extensions, and a command-line interface for publishing and managing extensions. The software is released under the Eclipse Public License 2.0 and can be deployed as a self-hosted registry.

== See also ==
- Visual Studio
- Eclipse Theia
- Eclipse Che
