= Augmented reality-based testing =

Augmented reality-based testing (ARBT) is a test method that combines augmented reality and software testing to enhance testing by inserting an additional dimension into the testers field of view. For example, a tester wearing a head-mounted display (HMD) or Augmented reality contact lenses that places images of both the physical world and registered virtual graphical objects over the user's view of the world can detect virtual labels on areas of a system to clarify test operating instructions for a tester who is performing tests on a complex system.

In 2009 as a spin-off to augmented reality for maintenance and repair (ARMAR) Alexander Andelkovic coined the idea 'augmented reality-based testing', introducing the idea of using augmented reality together with software testing.

== Overview ==
The test environment of technology is becoming more complex, this puts higher demand on test engineers to have higher knowledge, testing skills and work effective. A powerful unexplored dimension that can be utilized is the Virtual environment, a lot of information and data that today is available but unpractical to use due to overhead in time needed to gather and present can with ARBT be used instantly.

== Application ==
ARBT can be of help in following test environments:

=== Support ===
Assembling and disassembling a test object can be learned out and practice scenarios can be run through to learn how to fix fault scenarios that may occur.

=== Guidance ===
Minimizing risk of misunderstanding complex test procedures can be done by virtually describing test steps in front of the tester on the actual test object.

=== Educational ===
Background information about test scenario with earlier bugs found pointed out on the test object and reminders to avoid repeating previous mistakes made during testing of selected test area.

=== Training ===
Junior testers can learn complex test scenarios with less supervision. Test steps will be pointed out and information about pass criteria need to be confirmed the junior tester can train before the functionality is finished and do some regression testing.

=== Informational ===
Tester can point at a physical object and get detailed updated technical data and information needed to perform selected test task.

=== Inspire ===
Testers performing exploratory testing that need inspiration of areas to explore can get instant information about earlier exploratory test sessions gathered through session-based testing.

== See also ==
- Augmented reality
- Software testing
- Head-mounted display
- Virtual environment
- Exploratory testing
- Session-based testing
