= Better Software Magazine =

Digital magazine about software, published 1996–2018

Spring 2017 edition of Better Software Magazine

Better Software magazine was a quarterly digital magazine published by TechWell Corporation (formerly Software Quality Engineering). It covered topics of interest to software testers, developers, project managers, and business analysts. Better Software was originally published in 1996 as Software QA magazine, focusing primarily on software QA and testing. Software QA (a.k.a. Software Testing & Quality Engineering) was renamed Better Software magazine in 2004.

== History ==
In 1996, Software QA magazine was launched by Steve Whitchurch. In 1999, the magazine was relaunched by Software Quality Engineering (SQE) as Software Testing and Quality Engineering (STQE) with a companion website (STQE.net). In 2001, StickyMinds.com was launched whose name was inspired by STQE read: Sticky. In January 2004, the magazine name was changed to Better Software magazine to reflect the broader focus on the entire software lifecycle. In 2007, a digital edition was added alongside the print edition. In 2014, the print edition was discontinued and the magazine switched to strictly digital publication. Online version of Better Software magazine also ceased publication after the Summer 2018 issue. The issues are archived.

Better Software and its parent company SQE were included in the History of Software Testing, a comprehensive resource outlining the evolution of testing.

Better Software regularly featured on top-resource lists for software professionals. It was also cited in numerous software-testing focused books such as Software Test Attacks to Break Mobile and Embedded Devices, Agile Testing: A Practical Guide for Testers and Agile Teams, and More Agile Testing: Learning Journeys for the Whole Team.

Better Software was a recommended testing resource by the American Software Testing Qualifications Board.

== Awards ==
2000 - The Silver Award of Excellence for "Best New Magazine" (Florida Magazine Association)

2001 - "Best Overall Trade/Technical Magazine" (Florida Magazine Association), "Writing Excellence for Best Regular Column in a Trade/ Technical Magazine" (Florida Magazine Association)

2002 – Honorable Mention "Best Redesign" in the Business-to-Business under 35,000 distribution (FOLIO: Ozzie Award)

2007 – “Best feature design Trade/Technical magazine” (Florida Magazine Association), “Best feature headlines Trade/Technical magazine” (Florida Magazine Association)
2008 – “Best Special Theme Trade/Technical magazine” (Florida Magazine Association)

== Contributors ==
Better Software magazine writers have included: James Bach, Chris Wysopal, Rex Black, Lisa Crispin, Janet Gregory.
