= James Marcus Bach =

American software tester, author (born c. 1966)

James Marcus Bach (born c. 1966) is an American software tester, author, trainer, and consultant.

== Career ==
In his autobiography, Bach wrote that he worked as a software testing manager for Apple and Borland after dropping out of high school. He also programmed Apple II and Commodore 64 ports of various titles for Spinnaker Software.

Since 1999, he has worked as independent consultant based in Eastsound, Washington. As a witness in the 2001 United States v. Microsoft Corp. antitrust case, Bach testified that Microsoft could indeed unbundle Internet Explorer from Windows.

Bach is a proponent of exploratory testing and the context-driven school of software testing and is credited with developing session-based testing. He was a member of the board of directors of the Association for Software Testing. Lessons Learned in Software Testing, a book he co-authored, has been cited over 130 times according to Google Scholar, and several of his articles have been cited dozens of times including his work on heuristics for testing and on the Capability Maturity Model. He has written numerous articles for Computer.

He is an advisor to the Lifeboat Foundation as a computing expert. They credit him with developing the General Functionality and Stability Test Procedure for Microsoft, part of the Designed for Windows program.

== Personal life ==
Bach is the son of the author Richard Bach and Bach's first wife, Bette Jeanne Franks, and is the brother of Jonathan Bach, who is also a software tester.
