= Domain testing =

Domain testing is a software testing technique that involves selecting a small number of realistic test cases from a nearly infinite group of candidate test cases. It is one of the most widely practiced software testing techniques. Domain knowledge plays a very critical role while testing domain-specific work.
