= Exploratory testing =

Software testing approach

Exploratory testing is an approach to software testing that is concisely described as simultaneous learning, test design and test execution. Cem Kaner, who coined the term in 1984, defines exploratory testing as "a style of software testing that emphasizes the personal freedom and responsibility of the individual tester to continually optimize the quality of his/her work by treating test-related learning, test design, test execution, and test result interpretation as mutually supportive activities that run in parallel throughout the project."

While the software is being tested, the tester learns things that together with experience and creativity generate new good tests to run. Exploratory testing is often thought of as a black box testing technique. Instead, those who have studied it consider it a test approach that can be applied to any test technique, at any stage in the development process. The key is not the test technique nor the item being tested or reviewed; the key is the cognitive engagement of the tester, and the tester's responsibility for managing their time.

== History ==
Exploratory testing has always been performed by skilled testers. In the early 1990s, ad hoc was too often synonymous with sloppy and careless work. As a result, a group of test methodologists (now calling themselves the Context-Driven School) began using the term "exploratory" seeking to emphasize the dominant thought process involved in unscripted testing, and to begin to develop the practice into a teachable discipline. This new terminology was first published by Cem Kaner in his book Testing Computer Software and expanded upon in Lessons Learned in Software Testing. Exploratory testing can be as disciplined as any other intellectual activity.

== Description ==
Exploratory testing seeks to find out how the software actually works, and to ask questions about how it will handle difficult and easy cases. The quality of the testing is dependent on the tester's skill of inventing test cases and finding defects. The more the tester knows about the product and different test methods, the better the testing will be.

To further explain, comparison can be made of freestyle exploratory testing to its antithesis scripted testing. In the latter activity, test cases are designed in advance. This includes both the individual steps and the expected results. These tests are later performed by a tester who compares the actual result with the expected. When performing exploratory testing, expectations are open. Some results may be predicted and expected; others may not. The tester configures, operates, observes, and evaluates the product and its behaviour, critically investigating the result, and reporting information that seems likely to be a bug (which threatens the value of the product to some person) or an issue (which threatens the quality of the testing effort).

In reality, testing almost always is a combination of exploratory and scripted testing, but with a tendency towards either one, depending on context.

According to Kaner and James Marcus Bach, exploratory testing is more a mindset or "...a way of thinking about testing" than a methodology. They also say that it crosses a continuum from slightly exploratory (slightly ambiguous or vaguely scripted testing) to highly exploratory (freestyle exploratory testing).

The documentation of exploratory testing ranges from documenting all tests performed to just documenting the bugs. During pair testing, two persons create test cases together; one performs them, and the other documents. Session-based testing is a method specifically designed to make exploratory testing auditable and measurable on a wider scale.

Exploratory testers often use tools, including screen capture or video tools as a record of the exploratory session, or tools to quickly help generate situations of interest, e.g. James Bach's Perlclip.

== Benefits and drawbacks ==
The main advantage of exploratory testing is that less preparation is needed, important bugs are found quickly, and at execution time, the approach tends to be more intellectually stimulating than execution of scripted tests.

Another major benefit is that testers can use deductive reasoning based on the results of previous results to guide their future testing on the fly. They do not have to complete a current series of scripted tests before focusing in on or moving on to exploring a more target rich environment. This also accelerates bug detection when used intelligently.

Another benefit is that, after initial testing, most bugs are discovered by some sort of exploratory testing. This can be demonstrated logically by stating, "Programs that pass certain tests tend to continue to pass the same tests and are more likely to fail other tests or scenarios that are yet to be explored."

Disadvantages are that tests invented and performed on the fly can't be reviewed in advance (and by that prevent errors in code and test cases), and that it can be difficult to show exactly which tests have been run.

Freestyle exploratory test ideas, when revisited, are unlikely to be performed in exactly the same manner, which can be an advantage if it is important to find new errors; or a disadvantage if it is more important to repeat specific details of the earlier tests. This can be controlled with specific instruction to the tester, or by preparing automated tests where feasible, appropriate, and necessary, and ideally as close to the unit level as possible.

== Scientific studies ==
Replicated experiment has shown that while scripted and exploratory testing result in similar defect detection effectiveness (the total number of defects found) exploratory results in higher efficiency (the number of defects per time unit) as no effort is spent on pre-designing the test cases. Observational study on exploratory testers proposed that the use of knowledge about the domain, the system under test, and customers is an important factor explaining the effectiveness of exploratory testing. A case-study of three companies found that ability to provide rapid feedback was a benefit of Exploratory Testing while managing test coverage was pointed as a short-coming. A survey found that Exploratory Testing is also used in critical domains and that Exploratory Testing approach places high demands on the person performing the testing.

== See also ==
- Ad hoc testing
- Spike testing
