= Pair testing =

Software testing technique

Pair testing is a software development technique in which two team members work together at one keyboard to test the software application. One does the testing and the other analyzes or reviews the testing. This can be done between one tester and developer or business analyst or between two testers with both participants taking turns at driving the keyboard.

== Description ==
This can be more related to pair programming and exploratory testing of agile software development where two team members are sitting together to test the software application. This will help both the members to learn more about the application. This will narrow down the root cause of the problem while continuous testing. Developer can find out which portion of the source code is affected by the bug. This track can help to make the solid test cases and narrowing the problem for the next time.

== Benefits and drawbacks ==
- The developer can learn more about the software application by exploring with the tester. The tester can learn more about the implementation of the software application by exploring with the developer.
- The root cause of a bug can be analyzed more easily, and the tester can more easily test a bug fix when working with the developer.
- The developer may learn better test design skills.
- Pair testing may be less applicable to scripted testing where all the steps for running the test cases are already written.

== Usage ==
This is more applicable where the requirements and specifications are not very clear, the team is very new, and needs to learn the application behavior quickly.

This follows the same principles of pair programming; the two team members should be in the same level.

== See also ==
- Pair programming
- Exploratory testing
- Agile software development
- Software testing
- All-pairs testing
- International Software Testing Qualifications Board
