= Scenario testing =

Software testing activity that uses scenarios

Scenario testing is a software testing activity that uses scenarios: hypothetical stories to help the tester work through a complex problem or test system. The ideal scenario test is a credible, complex, compelling or motivating story; the outcome of which is easy to evaluate. These tests are usually different from test cases in that test cases are single steps whereas scenarios cover a number of steps.

== History ==
Cem Kaner coined the phrase scenario test by October 2003. He commented that one of the most difficult aspects of testing was maintaining step-by-step test cases along with their expected results. His paper attempted to find a way to reduce the re-work of complicated written tests and incorporate the ease of use cases.

A few months later, Hans Buwalda wrote about a similar approach he had been using that he called "soap opera testing". Like television soap operas these tests were both exaggerated in activity and condensed in time. The key to both approaches was to avoid step-by-step testing instructions with expected results and instead replace them with a narrative that gave freedom to the tester while confining the scope of the test.

== Methods ==
=== System scenarios ===
In this method only those sets of realistic, user activities that cover several components in the system are used as scenario tests. Development of system scenario can be done using:

1. Story lines
2. State transitions
3. Business verticals
4. Implementation story from customers

=== Use-case and role-based scenarios ===
In this method the focus is on how a user uses the system with different roles and environment.

== See also ==
- Test script
- Test suite
- Session-based testing
