= Source data =

Raw data that has not been processed for meaningful use to become information

Source data is raw data (sometimes called atomic data) that has not been processed for meaningful use to become Information.

== Examples ==
- Data entered at a till in a store
- A list of information about customers used in a mail merge in Word Processing
- Handwritten notes or printed documents, before they are typed in, such as an order form or CV
- Research data such as air temperature measurements

== Risks ==
Often when data is captured in one electronic system and then transferred to another, there is a loss of audit trail or the inherent data cannot be absolutely verified. There are systems that provide for absolute data export but then the system imported into has to allow for all available data fields to be imported. Similarly, there are transaction logs in many modern database systems. The acceptance of these transaction records into any new system could be very important for any verification of such imported data.

In research, gaining access to source data may be cumbersome. Particularly where sensitive personal data is involved, security and redaction (obscuring information) may be an issue.

== See also ==
- Computer Assisted Auditing Techniques
- Cooked data
- Information
- Information technology audit process
- Primary data and Secondary data
