= Test plan =

Type of document

A test plan is a document detailing the objectives, resources, and processes for a specific test session for a software or hardware product. The plan typically contains a detailed understanding of the eventual workflow.

== Test plans ==
A test plan documents the strategy that will be used to verify and ensure that a product or system meets its design specifications and other requirements. A test plan is usually prepared by or with significant input from test engineers.

Depending on the product and the responsibility of the organization to which the test plan applies, a test plan may include a strategy for one or more of the following:

- Design verification or compliance test – to be performed during the development or approval stages of the product, typically on a small sample of units.
- Manufacturing test or production test – to be performed during preparation or assembly of the product in an ongoing manner for purposes of performance verification and quality control.
- Acceptance test or commissioning test – to be performed at the time of delivery or installation of the product.
- Service and repair test – to be performed as required over the service life of the product.
- Regression test – to be performed on an existing operational product, to verify that existing functionality was not negatively affected when other aspects of the environment were changed (e.g., upgrading the platform on which an existing application runs).

A complex system may have a high-level test plan to address the overall requirements and supporting test plans to address the design details of subsystems and components.

Test plan document formats can be as varied as the products and organizations to which they apply. There are three major elements that should be described in the test plan: test coverage, test methods, and test responsibilities. These are also used in a formal test strategy.

=== Test coverage ===
Test coverage in the test plan states what requirements will be verified during what stages of the product life. Test coverage is derived from design specifications and other requirements, such as safety standards or regulatory codes, where each requirement or specification of the design ideally will have one or more corresponding means of verification. Test coverage for different product life stages may overlap but will not necessarily be exactly the same for all stages. For example, some requirements may be verified during design verification test, but not repeated during acceptance test. Test coverage also feeds back into the design process, since the product may have to be designed to allow test access.

=== Test methods ===
Test methods in the test plan state how test coverage will be implemented. Test methods may be determined by standards, regulatory agencies, or contractual agreement, or may have to be created new. Test methods also specify test equipment to be used in the performance of the tests and establish pass/fail criteria. Test methods used to verify hardware design requirements can range from very simple steps, such as visual inspection, to elaborate test procedures that are documented separately.

=== Test responsibilities ===
Test responsibilities include what organizations will perform the test methods and at each stage of the product life. This allows test organizations to plan, acquire or develop test equipment and other resources necessary to implement the test methods for which they are responsible. Test responsibilities also include what data will be collected and how that data will be stored and reported (often referred to as "deliverables"). One outcome of a successful test plan should be a record or report of the verification of all design specifications and requirements as agreed upon by all parties.

== IEEE 829 test plan structure ==
IEEE 829-2008, also known as the 829 Standard for Software Test Documentation, is an IEEE standard that specifies the form of a set of documents for use in defined stages of software testing, each stage potentially producing its own separate type of document. These stages are:

- Test plan identifier
- Introduction
- Test items
- Features to be tested
- Features not to be tested
- Approach
- Item pass/fail criteria
- Suspension criteria and resumption requirements
- Test deliverables
- Testing tasks
- Environmental needs
- Responsibilities
- Staffing and training needs
- Schedule
- Risks and contingencies
- Approvals

The IEEE documents that suggest what should be contained in a test plan are:

- 829-2008 IEEE Standard for Software and System Test Documentation
  - 829-1998 IEEE Standard for Software Test Documentation (superseded by 829-2008)
  - 829-1983 IEEE Standard for Software Test Documentation (superseded by 829-1998)
- 1008-1987 IEEE Standard for Software Unit Testing
- 1012-2004 IEEE Standard for Software Verification and Validation
  - 1012-1998 IEEE Standard for Software Verification and Validation (superseded by 1012-2004)
  - 1012-1986 IEEE Standard for Software Verification and Validation Plans (superseded by 1012-1998)
- 1059-1993 IEEE Guide for Software Verification & Validation Plans (withdrawn)

== See also ==
- Software testing
- Test suite
- Test case (software)
- Scenario testing
- Session-based testing
- IEEE 829
- Ad hoc testing
