= Operations readiness and assurance =

Operations readiness and assurance (OR&A) is a process used in the performance of primarily oil, gas and energy projects, to measure progress towards achieving the state of "readiness to operate". However, in recent years the robustness and adaptability of the process has enabled it to be deployed in Hydrogen production, Carbon Capture Utilisation & Storage (CCUS), Biofuels, Mining (for precious metals and minerals) and Aluminium Recycling.

The acronym "OR&A" was registered as a trademark in the UK in 2008 and is in continuous use by the owner David Powell, not least on the cover of the most recent text book on the subject "Operations Readiness and Assurance (OR&A) - The Definitive Reference. It is also clearly displayed on the supporting website www.or-and-a.co.uk.

OR&A also includes an assurance component which gives an ongoing, real-time indication of the likelihood that the project will achieve that state by the time of handover to the eventual owner/operator.

== Operations Readiness ==
Operations readiness is the process of preparing the custodians of an asset under construction, and their supporting organisation, to be fully ready to assume ownership of the asset at the point of delivery/handover, and to be able to take responsibility for performing the safe and efficient operation of that asset in a sustainable and environmentally-friendly manner.

== Assurance ==
Assurance refers to stakeholders in a project who cannot wait until a project is completed, and handover to the operations team imminent, to discover that something has been omitted or overlooked which would subsequently prevent operation of the asset in the manner stated above. The word 'assurance' refers to the act of reassuring the various stakeholders in a project or venture that their asset and organisation is in a state of operations readiness, or providing a measure of assurance that it will be by the time it is required.

== Implementing methods ==
The first issue facing an OR&A practitioner on a project is how to disseminate the vast amount of information required to implement OR&A in a way that neither 'swamps' users in a sea of information nor 'starves' them of vital information required to complete the various activities and tasks at the appropriate time.

Some methods developed to address this problem involve the use of a secure private cloud-based system, to allow the user to manage the volume of information within the system, and to present it in a manageable way. This system, accessed though a secure login over the internet, provides a central point for the management of information, minimising the maintenance requirements for the system, and ensuring that all users can access the information.
