= Cem Kaner =

American lawyer and software testing writer

Cem Kaner is a professor of software engineering at Florida Institute of Technology, and the Director of Florida Tech's Center for Software Testing Education & Research (CSTER) since 2004. He is perhaps best known outside academia as an advocate of software usability and software testing.

Prior to his professorship, Kaner worked in the software industry beginning in 1983 in Silicon Valley "as a tester, programmer, tech writer, software development manager, product development director, and independent software development consultant." In 1988, he and his co-authors Jack Falk and Hung Quoc Nguyen published what became, at the time, "the best selling book on software testing," Testing Computer Software. He has also worked as a user interface designer.

In 2004 he cofounded the non-profit Association for Software Testing.

== Education ==
Kaner received a Bachelor's Degree from Brock University in 1974, having focused on mathematics and philosophy. He went on to receive a Ph.D. in experimental psychology from McMaster University in 1984, with a dissertation in the area of psychophysics (the measurement of perceptual experiences). He later attended Golden Gate University Law School, with a primary interest in the law of software quality, graduating with a J.D. in 1994.

== Consumer and Software Quality Advocacy ==
Kaner worked as a part-time volunteer for the Santa Clara, California Department of Consumer Affairs, investigating and mediating consumer complaints. In the 1990s, he got trial experience working as a full-time volunteer Deputy District Attorney, and later counselled independent consultants, technical book writers, and independent test labs on contract and intellectual property issues as an attorney. He also did legislative work as a consumer protection advocate, including participation in the drafting of the Uniform Computer Information Transactions Act (as an advocate for customers and small software development firms), and the Uniform Electronic Transactions Act, and he participated in the United States Department of State's Advisory Committee on Private International Law: Study Group on Electronic Commerce. In 1999, he was elected to the American Law Institute, after being in practice for only five years.

This experience led him, in collaboration with David Pels, to publish Bad Software: What To Do When Software Fails in 1997. This book was intended "to help people who had bought a defective computer program, with advice on troubleshooting their own problems, interacting with technical support, reporting problems to consumer protection agencies, bringing a lawsuit in small claims court, and if necessary, hiring a lawyer to bring a formal lawsuit."

== Publications ==
=== Books ===
- Testing Computer Software (1st ed.). N.p.: TAB Professional & Reference Books. December 1987. ISBN 0-8306-9563-X.
- Testing Computer Software (2nd ed.). N.p.: International Thomson Computer Press. 1993. ISBN 0-442-01361-2. (with coauthors Jack Falk and Hung Q. Nguyen)
- Bad Software: What To Do When Software Fails. New York: John Wiley & Sons. 28 September 1998. ISBN 0-471-31826-4. (with coauthor David L. Pels)
- Testing Computer Software (2nd (softback) ed.). New York: Wiley. 12 April 1999 [1993]. ISBN 0-471-35846-0. (with coauthors Jack Falk and Hung Q. Nguyen) (Received the Award of Excellence from the Society for Technical Communication, Northern California Technical Publications Competition.)
- Lessons Learned in Software Testing: A Context-driven Approach. New York: Wiley. 15 December 2001. ISBN 0-471-08112-4. LCC QA76.76.T48 K34 2001. (with coauthors James Bach and Bret Pettichord and editor Margaret Eldridge)
- The Domain Testing Workbook. Context Driven Press. 30 October 2013. ISBN 978-0989811903. (with coauthors Sowmya Padmanabhan and Douglas Hoffman)
- Foundations of Software Testing Workbook. Context Driven Press. 30 December 2013. ISBN 978-0989811927. (with coauthor Rebecca L. Fiedler)

=== Articles ===
- "A Better Random Number Generator for Apple's Floating Point BASIC" (PDF). MICRO. June 1984. pp. 26–35. Archived from the original (PDF) on 2003-07-15. (with coauthor John R. Vokey)
- "Liability for Defective Documentation" (PDF). Software QA Quarterly. 2 (3): 8–13. 1995. Archived from the original (PDF) on 2006-08-15.
- "Bad Software—Who is Liable?" (PDF). Proceedings of the American Society for Quality's 52nd Annual Quality Congress. May 1998. Archived from the original (PDF) on 2004-12-06.
- "Article 2B and Reverse Engineering" (PDF). Uniform Commercial Code Bulletin. November 1998. pp. 1–9. Archived from the original (PDF) on 2004-12-06.
- "Recruiting Software Testers" (PDF). 12th International Software Quality Conference (Quality Week). San Jose, CA. June 1999. Archived from the original (PDF) on 2004-06-09.
- "UCITA: A disaster in progress" (PDF). IEEE Spectrum. 39 (8): 13–15. August 2002. doi:10.1109/MSPEC.2002.1021944. Archived from the original (PDF) on 2006-08-15.
