= BVT =

BVT may refer to:

- The Bobby Van Trust, a group of charities that improve home security in the UK
- BVT Surface Fleet, former name of BAE Systems Maritime – Naval Ships, British naval shipbuilding company
- Bandwidth-variable transponder, a type of transponder used in optical networks
- The Beaverton Valley Times, a weekly newspaper in Oregon, United States
- Bee venom therapy, a type of apitherapy
- Blackstone Valley Regional Vocational Technical High School, a technical high school in Upton, Massachusetts
- BVT, ISO 3166-1 alpha-3 country code for Bouvet Island
- Borrowed Virtual Time, a soft real-time algorithm for Scheduling (computing)
- Bournville Village Trust, the governing body of Bournville, England
- Brevet (military), a warrant authorizing a commissioned officer to hold a higher rank temporarily
- Build verification test, a procedure in software testing
- Bundesamt für Verfassungsschutz und Terrorismusbekämpfung (Federal Office for the Protection of the Constitution and Counterterrorism), Austria's intelligence agency
- Black Velvet Travel, a bus company in Hampshire, England.
- Bek Vol Tanden, Dutch expression
- Boundary volume tree, another name for Bounding volume hierarchy
- BVT Publishing, an American publisher of textbooks
