= Recovery as a service =

Category of cloud computing

Recovery as a service (RaaS), sometimes referred to as disaster recovery as a service (DRaaS), is a category of cloud computing used for protecting an application or data from a natural or human disaster or service disruption at one location by enabling a full recovery in the cloud. RaaS differs from cloud-based backup services by protecting data and providing standby computing capacity on demand to facilitate more rapid application recovery. RaaS capacity is delivered in a cloud-computing model so recovery resources are only paid for when they are used, making it more efficient than a traditional disaster recovery warm site or hot site where the recovery resources must be running at all times.

The term "recovery as a service" (RaaS) is considered to be part of the nomenclature of cloud computing, along with infrastructure as a service (IaaS), platform as a service (PaaS), and software as a service (SaaS).

== RaaS architectural models ==
RaaS architectural models vary depending on the location of the primary or source production application or data.

- To-cloud RaaS: To-cloud recovery is when the source application is in the users' primary private datacenter and the cloud is being used as a backup or recovery target.
- In-cloud RaaS: In-cloud recovery is when both the source and recovery sites are in the cloud.
- From-cloud RaaS: From-cloud recovery is when the primary or production application or data is in the cloud and the backup or recovery target site is a private datacenter.

== Recovery testing with RaaS ==
Sandboxes are a common feature of RaaS solutions. A RaaS sandbox is a pool of infrastructure resources in which a test copy of the RaaS protected application can be deployed and tested. The sandbox copy is restricted from accessing the network and is only accessible to the system administrator. It is used to test the RaaS recovery process without disrupting the running application. Because the sandbox is cloud, the resources are created on demand, paid for while used, and discarded when the recovery testing is completed.

== In the marketplace ==
Because more corporations are moving their technical infrastructure to cloud services, the need for backup continues to grow. Companies which rely on large cloud service providers such as Microsoft are often unaware that they are responsible for backing up and recovering their data.

As this awareness grows, the market for disaster recovery as a service is expected to grow. The worldwide market for disaster recovery as a service approached 2 billion dollars in 2017, and some experts predict it will reach 13 billion dollars by 2023.

== See also ==
- as a service
