= Sanity check =

Test to check if a hypothesis is rational

A sanity check or sanity test is a basic test to quickly evaluate whether a claim or the result of a calculation can possibly be true. It is a simple check to see if the produced material is rational (that the material's creator was thinking rationally, applying sanity). The point of a sanity test is to rule out certain classes of obviously false results, not to catch every possible error. A rule-of-thumb or back-of-the-envelope calculation may be checked to perform the test. The advantage of performing an initial sanity test is that of speedily evaluating basic function.

In arithmetic, for example, when multiplying by 9, using the divisibility rule for 9 to verify that the sum of digits of the result is divisible by 9 is a sanity test—it will not catch every multiplication error, but is a quick and simple method to discover many possible errors.

In computer science, a sanity test is a very brief run-through of the functionality of a computer program, system, calculation, or other analysis, to assure that part of the system or methodology works roughly as expected. This is often prior to a more exhaustive round of testing.

== Use in different fields ==
=== Mathematical ===
A sanity test can refer to various orders of magnitude and other simple rule-of-thumb devices applied to cross-check mathematical calculations. For example:

- If one were to attempt to square 738 and calculated 54,464, a quick sanity check could show that this result cannot be true. Consider that 700 < 738, yet 700^{2} = 7^{2} × 100^{2} = 490,000 > 54,464. Since squaring positive integers preserves their inequality, the result cannot be true, and so the calculated result is incorrect. The correct answer, 738^{2} = 544,644, is more than 10 times higher than 54,464.
- In multiplication, 918 × 155 is not 142,135 since 918 is divisible by three but 142,135 is not (digits add up to 16, not a multiple of three). Also, the product must end in the same digit as the product of end-digits: 8 × 5 = 40, but 142,135 does not end in "0" like "40", while the correct answer does: 918 × 155 = 142,290. An even quicker check is that the product of even and odd numbers is even, whereas 142,135 is odd.

=== Physical ===
- Dimensional analysis may be used as a sanity check of physical equations: the two sides of any equation must be commensurable or have the same dimensions. A person who has calculated the power output of a car to be 700 kJ may have omitted a factor, since the unit joules is a measure of energy, not power (energy per unit time).
- When determining physical properties, comparing to known or similar substances will often yield insight on whether the result is reasonable. For instance, most metals sink in water, so the density of most metals should be greater than that of water (~1000 kg/m^{3}).
- Fermi estimates will often provide insight on the order of magnitude of an expected value.

=== Software development ===
In software development, a sanity test (a form of software testing which offers "quick, broad, and shallow testing") evaluates the result of a subset of application functionality to determine whether it is possible and reasonable to proceed with further testing of the entire application. Sanity tests may sometimes be used interchangeably with smoke tests insofar as both terms denote tests which determine whether it is possible and reasonable to continue testing further. On the other hand, a distinction is sometimes made that a smoke test is a non-exhaustive test that ascertains whether the most crucial functions of a programme work before proceeding with further testing whereas a sanity test refers to whether specific functionality such as a particular bug fix works as expected without testing the wider functionality of the software. In other words, a sanity test determines whether the intended result of a code change works correctly while a smoke test ensures that nothing else important was broken in the process. Sanity testing and smoke testing avoid wasting time and effort by quickly determining whether an application is too flawed to merit more rigorous QA testing, but needs more developer debugging.

Groups of sanity tests are often bundled together for automated unit testing of functions, libraries, or applications prior to merging development code into a testing or trunk version control branch, for automated building, or for continuous integration and continuous deployment.

Another common usage of sanity test is to denote checks which are performed within programme code, usually on arguments to functions or returns therefrom, to see if the answers can be assumed to be correct. The more complicated the routine, the more important that its response be checked. The trivial case is checking to see whether the return value of a function indicated success or failure, and to therefore cease further processing upon failure. This return value is actually often itself the result of a sanity check. For example, if the function attempted to open, write to, and close a file, a sanity check may be used to ensure that it did not fail on any of these actions—which is a sanity check often ignored by programmers.

These kinds of sanity checks may be used during development for debugging purposes and also to aid in troubleshooting software runtime errors.

Sanity checks are also performed upon installation of stable, production software code into a new computing environment to ensure that all dependencies are met, such as a compatible operating system and link libraries. When a computing environment has passed all the sanity checks, it is considered a sane environment for the installation programme to proceed with reasonable expectation of success.

A "Hello, World!" program is often used as a sanity test for a development environment similarly. Rather than a complicated script running a set of unit tests, if this simple programme fails to compile or execute, it proves that the supporting environment likely has a configuration problem that will prevent any code from compiling or executing. But if "Hello world" executes, then any problems experienced with other programmes likely can be attributed to errors in that application's code rather than the environment.

The Association for Computing Machinery, and software projects such as Android and MediaWiki discourage use of the phrase sanity check in favour of other terms such as confidence test, coherence check, or simply test, as part of a wider attempt to avoid ableist language and increase inclusivity.

=== Vibe coding ===
Sanity checking is often used in vibe coding, especially between different AI models (although two separate instances of the same model can work in some cases), in order to have a different AI model cover any blind spots or check for any potential errors or faulty logic using a third-party source. This can also be done by human debuggers as with human-written code.

== See also ==
- Certifying algorithm
- Checksum
- Fermi problem
- Mental calculation
- Proof of concept
