= Functional testing =

Testing software functionality

In software development, functional testing is a form of software testing that verifies whether a system meets its functional requirements.

Generally, functional testing is black-box, meaning the internal program structure is ignored (unlike for white-box testing).

Sometimes, functional testing is a quality assurance (QA) process.

As a form of system testing, functional testing tests slices of functionality of the whole system. Despite similar naming, functional testing is not testing the code of a single function.

The concept of incorporating testing earlier in the delivery cycle is not restricted to functional testing.

== Types ==
Functional testing includes but is not limited to:

=== Sanity testing ===
A sanity check or sanity test is a basic test to quickly evaluate whether a claim or the result of a calculation can possibly be true. It is a simple check to see if the produced material is rational (that the material's creator was thinking rationally, applying sanity). The point of a sanity test is to rule out certain classes of obviously false results, not to catch every possible error. A rule-of-thumb or back-of-the-envelope calculation may be checked to perform the test. The advantage of performing an initial sanity test is that of speedily evaluating basic function.

=== Smoke testing ===
In computer programming and software testing, smoke testing (also confidence testing, sanity testing, build verification test (BVT) and build acceptance test) is preliminary testing or sanity testing to reveal simple failures severe enough to, for example, reject a prospective software release. Smoke tests are a subset of test cases that cover the most important functionality of a component or system, used to aid assessment of whether main functions of the software appear to work correctly. When used to determine if a computer program should be subjected to further, more fine-grained testing, a smoke test may be called a pretest or an intake test. Alternatively, it is a set of tests run on each new build of a product to verify that the build is testable before the build is released into the hands of the test team. In the DevOps paradigm, use of a build verification test step is one hallmark of the continuous integration maturity stage.

=== Regression testing ===
Regression testing (rarely, non-regression testing) is re-running functional and non-functional tests to ensure that previously developed and tested software still performs as expected after a change. If not, that would be called a regression.

=== Usability testing ===
Usability testing is a technique used in user-centered interaction design to evaluate a product by testing it on users. This can be seen as an irreplaceable usability practice, since it gives direct input on how real users use the system. It is more concerned with the design intuitiveness of the product and tested with users who have no prior exposure to it. Such testing is paramount to the success of an end product as a fully functioning application that creates confusion amongst its users will not last for long. This is in contrast with usability inspection methods where experts use different methods to evaluate a user interface without involving users.

== Six steps ==
Functional testing typically involves six steps

1. The identification of functions that the software is expected to perform
2. The creation of input data based on the function's specifications
3. The determination of output based on the function's specifications
4. The execution of the test case
5. The comparison of actual and expected outputs
6. To check whether the application works as per the customer need

== Open-source tools ==
Several open-source tools support functional testing across web, mobile, and API applications. These include:

- Selenium – Web browser automation
- Playwright – Cross-browser end-to-end testing
- Robot Framework – Keyword-driven automation
- Appium – Mobile application testing
- SoapUI – API functional testing
- Keploy – API testing and test generation

== See also ==
- Non-functional testing – Testing the qualities as opposed to the correctness of software
- Acceptance testing – Test to determine if the requirements of a specification or contract are met
- Regression testing – Checking whether changes to software have broken functionality that used to work
- System testing – Testing conducted on a complete software system
- Software testing – Checking software against expectations
- Integration testing – Type of software testing
- Unit testing – Validating the behavior of isolated source code
- Database testing – Testing of database software systems
- Security testing – Finding flaws in the security of information systems
- Load testing – Process of putting demand on a system and measuring its response
- Test automation – Use of purpose-built software to control test execution
