= State space enumeration =

In computer science, state space enumeration are methods that consider each reachable program state to determine whether a program satisfies a given property. As programs increase in size and complexity, the state space grows exponentially. The state space used by these methods can be reduced by maintaining only the parts of the state space that are relevant to the analysis. However, the use of state and memory reduction techniques makes runtime a major limiting factor.

== See also ==
- Formal methods
- Model checking
