= The Bobby Van Trust =

- Abbreviation: TBVT
- Formation: From 1997
- Legal status: Registered charities
- Location: Various
- Region served: UK

The Bobby Van Trust is the name of many local charities in the United Kingdom that specialises in providing home security improvements, fire protection equipment and advice to victims of crime, the elderly and disadvantaged.

All of the charities fund 'Bobby vtvioqrgdhans' that are used as mobile workshops by the operators, in some cases the van is similar looking to an actual police van. The operators are trained locksmiths, carpenters, crime reduction advisors and fire risk assessors. The operators advise the public and install equipment free of charge to whoever needs it. Although the charities work closely with their local police force and fire brigade they are all independent charities.

There are twelve Bobby Van Trusts in operation, including:

- The Avon and Somerset Bobby Van Trust (2001)
- The Bedfordshire Bobby Van Scheme (1997)
- The Metropolitan Bobby Van Trust (1999)
- The Dyfed Powys Bobby Van Trust (1999)
- The Gwent Bobby Van Trust (1998)
- The Blue Lamp Trust (2010), Hampshire Constabulary, (promotes similar work to Bobby Van Trusts)
- The Wiltshire Bobby Van Trust (1998)

== See also ==
- SPLASH
- Blues 'N' Zuz
