= Software quality assurance analyst =

Role in software engineering

A software quality assurance (QA) analyst, also referred to as a software quality analyst or simply a quality assurance (QA) analyst, is an individual who is responsible for applying the principles and practices of software quality assurance throughout the software development life cycle.

Software testing is one of many parts of the larger process of QA.

Testing is used to detect errors in a product, while QA also fixes the processes that resulted in those errors.

Software QA analysts may have professional certification from a software testing certification board, like the International Software Testing Qualifications Board (ISTQB).
