= Software load testing =

The term load testing or stress testing is used in different ways in the professional software testing community. Load testing generally refers to the practice of modeling the expected usage of a software program by simulating multiple users accessing the program concurrently.

== Browser-level vs. protocol-level users ==
Historically, all load testing was performed with automated API tests that simulated traffic through concurrent interactions at the protocol layer (often called protocol level users or PLUs). With the advance of containers and cloud infrastructure, the option is now present to test with real browsers (often called browser level users or BLUs). Each approach has its merits for different types of applications, but generally, browser-level users will be more akin to the real traffic that a website will experience and provide a more realistic load profile and response time measurement. BLUs are certainly a more expensive way of running tests and cannot work with all types of applications, specifically those that are not accessible through a web browser like a desktop client or API-based application.

== Load testing tools ==
Tool name	Company name	License	Type	Pricing	Focus	Notes
Apache JMeter	Apache Software Foundation	Apache License 2.0	Local	Free		Java desktop application for load testing and performance measurement.
BlazeMeter	Perforce Software, Inc	Proprietary	Cloud-based	Free version, demo, paid plan, contact for pricing	Website, web app, mobile, database, and other scenarios	Scalable load up to 200,000 concurrent simulated browser users from across eight geographical locations. Can also be used for integration and functional testing.
Blitz (discontinued in 2018)	Spirent Communications	Proprietary	Cloud-based	Trial available	Websites, mobile, and REST APIs	It allows to simulate of up to 50,000 simultaneous virtual users from different worldwide locations.
Flood (discontinued in 2024)	Tricentis APAC Pty Ltd	Proprietary	Cloud-based	Free plan, paid plan, contact for pricing	Browser based load testing, APIs and protocol driven applications	Scalable load up to millions of concurrent users from all geographic regions available on AWS and Azure, plus on-premise deployments. Pricing is based on Virtual User Hours consumed each month.
Gatling	Gatling Corp	Apache License 2.0	Local, cloud-based	Free version, demo, paid plan, contact for pricing	Java web applications	Portable HTML reports.
HammerDB		GPLv3	Local	Free	Databases	Database load testing and benchmarking tool.
Loader.io	SendGrid, Inc	Proprietary	Cloud-based	Free plan, paid plan, contact for pricing	Web applications and API	
Keploy	HybridK8s Pvt. Ltd.	Apache License 2.0	Local, cloud-based	Free	APIs and integration testing	Open-source AI-powered testing platform that generates tests and mocks from application traffic.
LoadRunner	OpenText	Proprietary	Local, Cloud-based	Free community edition; other: demo, free trial, contact for pricing		Primarily used for executing large numbers of tests (or a large number of virtual users) concurrently. Can be used for unit and integration testing as well.
LoadUI (integrated now in ReadyAPI)	SmartBear Software	EUPL	Local	Demo available		Cross-platform load testing tool, targeted mainly at web services. Integrates with soapUI.
Locust	Open source	MIT License	Local, cloud-based	Free, hosted paid version available		Python based framework with load tests expressed in regular code
Login VSI	Login VSI, Inc.	Proprietary	Local	Demo, contact for pricing	Virtual windows desktops workloads	
NeoLoad	Tricentis	Proprietary	Local, cloud-based	Free trial, demo, contact for pricing	Web and mobile	Load can be generated from local agents or from the cloud.
OpenSTA	CYRANO	GNU General Public License 2.0	Local	Free	Web server	Utilizes a distributed software architecture based on CORBA. OpenSTA binaries available for Windows.
Parasoft SOAtest	Parasoft	Proprietary	Local, cloud-based	Demo, contact for pricing		Performance testing tool that verifies functionality and performance under load. Supports SOAtest tests, JUnits, lightweight socket-based components. Detects concurrency issues.
Rational Performance Tester	IBM	Proprietary	Local, cloud-based	Contact for pricing		Eclipse-based large-scale performance testing tool primarily used for executing large volume performance tests to measure system response time for server-based applications.
Siege	Open source	GPLv3 or later	Local	Free	Web servers	Supports basic authentication, cookies, HTTP, HTTPS and FTP protocols.
Silk Performer	Micro Focus	Proprietary	Local, cloud-based	Free trial, contact for pricing		Application performance tool with cloud and local virtual agents. Supports most protocols and applications. Licensed.
SoapUI	SmartBear Software	EUPL Version 1.1	Local	Free		
Test Studio	Progress Telerik	Proprietary	Local	Free trial, demo, paid plan		Assess how the website would perform if visited by a large number of users at the same time.
Tsung	Open Source	GPL-2.0	Local	Free	Web servers, Databases, XMPP	It can be used to stress HTTP, WebDAV, SOAP, PostgreSQL, MySQL, LDAP, MQTT and Jabber/XMPP servers.
Visual Studio Enterprise edition (deprecated after Visual Studio 2019)	Microsoft	Proprietary	Local	Paid plan		Visual Studio Enterprise edition includes a load test tool that enables a developer to execute a variety of tests (web, unit, etc...) with a combination of configurations to simulate real user load. Microsoft announced that its web performance and load test functionality was deprecated after Visual Studio 2019.
Vegeta		MIT License	Local	Free	HTTP applications	
WebLOAD	RadView Software Ltd	Proprietary	Local, cloud-based	Free trial, demo, contact for pricing	Web and Mobile applications and API	Load testing tool for web and mobile applications including Web Dashboard for performance test analysis. Used for large-scale loads which can be generated also from the cloud. Licensed.
OctoPerf	OctoPerf	Proprietary	Local & Cloud-Based	Free plan, paid plans, contact for pricing	Websites, web applications, mobile, databases, and other scenarios	SaaS and On-Premise load testing tool
