= Silk Performer =

Software performance testing tool

- Developer: OpenText
- Stable release: 21.0 / December 1, 2020; 5 years ago
- Operating system: Microsoft Windows
- Available in: English, Japanese, Chinese
- Type: Load testing
- License: Commercial proprietary software
- Website: microfocus.com/products/silk-portfolio/silk-performer/

Silk Performer is a software performance testing tool that is used to test web, mobile, and enterprise applications, monitor server uptime and metrics, and identify performance issues.

The tool was originally developed by Segue Software, which was later acquired by Borland in 2006. Subsequent acquisitions made it part of Micro Focus in 2009, then OpenText in 2023.

== History ==
- Segue Software Era: Silk Performer was originally conceived and developed by Segue Software.
- Borland Acquisition (2006): Borland acquired Segue Software, thereby taking ownership of Silk Performer.
- Micro Focus Era (2009): In 2009, Micro Focus International acquired Borland, and with it, Silk Performer became part of Micro Focus's software suite.
- OpenText Era: In 2023, OpenText acquired Micro Focus International, Silk Performer became part of OpenText Application Delivery portfolio.

== Description ==
Silk Performer supports major Web 2.0 environments like Adobe’s Flash/Flex, Microsoft Silverlight, and HTML/AJAX. Silk Performer also supports load testing Web applications at the protocol level (HTTP).

Silk Performer helps predict and prevent outages to future-proof business performance. Supports mobile web devices and cloud computing generation load through cloud technologies.

Load testing is also made with the help of JMeter, LoadRunner, WebLoad, etc.

== See also ==
- Software performance testing
- Micro Focus Unified Functional Testing
