= Flood.io =

Software testing tool

Tricentis Flood
- Formerly: Flood IO
- Type: Private
- Industry: Software
- Founded: July 2013
- Founders: Tim Koopmans; Mikel Lindsaar; Ivan Vanderbyl
- Fate: Acquired by Tricentis
- Headquarters: Melbourne, Australia
- Products: Flood Element; Ruby JMeter
- Parent: Tricentis
- Website: flood.io

Flood IO is a load testing platform that executes globally-distributed performance tests from open source tools, including JMeter, Gatling, and Selenium. It also runs test plans written with Ruby JMeter, an open source RubyGem.

== Tricentis Flood ==
Flood is SaaS load testing service that runs existing test scripts across a globally-distributed grid infrastructure. It was built with a shared-nothing architecture and integrates with AWS and Azure. Users can generate over 1 million globally-distributed requests per second without manually setting up the associated infrastructure or correlating the distributed results. The service provides detailed analysis reports and real-time monitoring.

In July 2017, Flood IO was acquired by Tricentis and now goes by the name Tricentis Flood Flood.io has been discontinued in June 2024.

== Ruby JMeter ==
Ruby JMeter is a RubyGem that lets users write test plans for JMeter in any text editor with an expressive domain-specific language for communication with JMeter. It also includes API integration with Flood. Ruby JMeter is licensed as open-source software under the MIT License, which means it permits reuse within proprietary software provided that all copies of the licensed software include a copy of the MIT License terms and the copyright notice.

== Flood Element ==
Flood Element is a load generation tool which uses the Google Chrome web browser to generate load on a web application by spawning thousands of browser instances and running a predefined test script to simulate a series of user interactions. Flood Element test scripts are written in TypeScript and follow a similar syntax to Selenium.

== See also ==
- Load testing tools
- Performance Engineering
- JMeter
- Gatling
- Selenium
- Software performance testing
- Software testing
- Web server benchmarking
