= Tricentis Tosca =

Software test automation tool

- Developer: Tricentis
- Stable release: 16.0 / February 2023; 3 years ago
- Operating system: Microsoft Windows
- Type: Test automation
- License: Proprietary
- Website: www.tricentis.com

Tricentis Tosca is a software testing tool that is used to automate end-to-end testing for software applications. It is developed by Tricentis.

Tricentis Tosca combines multiple aspects of software testing (test case design, test automation, test data design and generation, and analytics) to test GUIs and APIs from a business perspective. Two of the most frequently-noted technologies used in Tricentis Tosca are related to Model-based testing and Risk-based testing.

== Model-based testing ==
Instead of using scripting for test automation, Tricentis Tosca applies a model-based testing approach and creates a model of the application under test. Technical details about the application under test, test case logic, and test data are saved separately and joined together at test execution time. When an element in the application under test changes, the technical details are updated once in the central model. Since the test cases inherit from this model, the various test cases that test the updated element do not need to be modified manually to reflect the change.

== Risk-based testing ==
Based on a risk assessment of the application under test’s requirements, Tricentis Tosca uses risk-based test design to suggest the most effective test cases and identify the risk contribution of each test cases. It also uses a variety of methodologies (such as equivalence partitioning, boundary testing, and combinatorial methods such as linear expansion) to try to minimize the number of test cases while increasing risk coverage. After the tests are executed, the tool aggregates risk coverage from business, technical, and compliance perspectives.

== Additional technologies ==
Tricentis Tosca features technologies for GUI testing, API testing, Mobile testing, Service virtualization, Test data design and generation, Business intelligence and data warehouse testing, and Exploratory testing. It has SAP-certified integration with SAP solutions, and is used to automate testing for SAP technologies such as SAP S/4HANA, SAP Fiori 2.0, SuccessFactors, SAP CRM, Concur Technologies, SAP Ariba, and SAP Business Information Warehouse.

== See also ==
- Automated testing
- Software testing
