= Tricentis =

Austrian software testing company

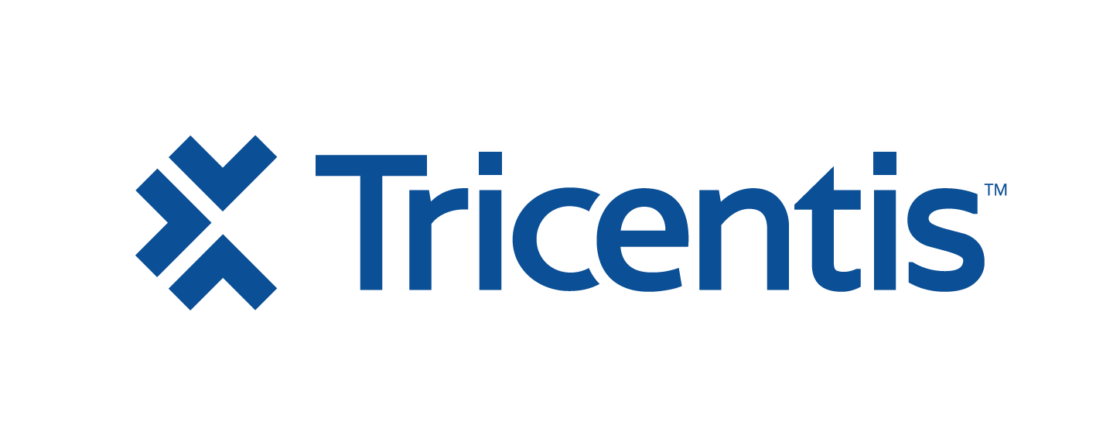
- Type: Private
- Industry: Software, information technology
- Founded: 2007; 19 years ago in Vienna, Austria
- Founders: Wolfgang Platz; Franz Fuchsberger
- Headquarters: Austin, Texas, US
- Key people: Kevin Thompson (CEO)
- Products: Tricentis Tosca qTest; LiveCompare; Flood.io; NeoLoad
- Services: Software testing, software quality assurance
- Revenue: US$430 million (2023)
- Owner: Insight Partners (71%)
- Website: tricentis.com

Tricentis is a software testing company founded in 2007 and headquartered in Austin, Texas. It provides software testing automation and software quality assurance products for enterprise software.

== History ==
Tricentis was founded in 2007 in Vienna, Austria, by Wolfgang Platz and Franz Fuchsberger, extending their previous consulting business into a software company. The company is headquartered in Austin, Texas.

In 2000, Platz developed Tricentis Tosca Explorer, the predecessor to the core component of Tricentis Tosca. By 2006 Tricentis Tosca Commander was developed and launched into the market as the central GUI for the product. The product has since been extended to cover risk-based testing, test design, SAP testing, API testing, service virtualization, exploratory testing, load testing, and test data management in addition to GUI testing.

In 2012, Tricentis raised $9 million in early-stage investment from Viewpoint, now part of Kennet Partners. In 2013, Sandeep Johri became the CEO.

In 2017, Tricentis received $165 million in series B funding from Insight Venture Partners.

In July 2020, Tricentis entered a partnership with SAP, an enterprise software corporation. Under the partnership, the Tricentis continuous testing platform will be the testing platform for the SAP Solution Extensions program and is being integrated into the SAP Application Lifecycle Management (ALM) portfolio. The Tricentis tools use machine learning algorithms to identify potential integration risks between SAP and third-party applications. They are also used to automate end-to-end testing across SAP and associated applications.

In April 2021, Kevin Thompson became the CEO and chairman of the board.

== Acquisitions ==
In 2017, Tricentis acquired Flood.io, an on-demand load testing platform.

In 2018, Tricentis merged with QASymphony, a test management software company and acquired Q-up test data management.

In 2019, Tricentis acquired IntelliCorp's change impact analysis for SAP product LiveCompare, as well as LiveModel and LiveInterface. Also in 2019, Tricentis acquired TestProject, a community-powered test automation platform. TestProject is built on the open-source test automation tools Selenium and Appium, and uses AI-based matching to automatically analyze applications and recommend add-ons to enhance testing.

In January 2020, Tricentis acquired SpecFlow, which allows developers to define, manage, and execute human-readable tests using behavior-driven development (BDD). SpecFlow reached its end of life (EOL) on December 31, 2024.

In March 2021, Tricentis acquired Neotys, a performance testing tool for modern and legacy technologies including SAP, APIs, databases, and cloud native apps.

Tricentis acquired SeaLights, a software quality intelligence platform, on July 17, 2024, expanding its quality engineering and AI-driven testing capabilities.

== Services ==
Tricentis provides international services to several industries including the financial, commerce, insurance, healthcare, telecommunications, logistics and transports, utilities, and software industries.

In addition, it provides training and consulting services in the areas of software quality assurance. These services include programs related to test automation and transformation.

== Products ==
Tricentis' main products include Tricentis Tosca, qTest, LiveCompare, NeoLoad, Tricentis Testim, Tricentis Data Integrity, Tricentis SeaLights, Tricentis Vera, Tricentis Flood, Tricentis Test Automation for ServiceNow, and Tricentis Test Automation for Salesforce.

Tricentis Tosca is a continuous testing platform that supports test case design, test automation, test data management, and analytics for testing graphical user interfaces (GUIs) and APIs from a business perspective.

qTest is a test management platform designed to support agile and DevOps development workflows, including requirements tracking, test planning, execution, and reporting.

LiveCompare is a change impact analysis tool that uses artificial intelligence to identify potential risks in SAP environments by analyzing code, configuration, and transport changes.

NeoLoad is an automated performance testing platform used to test APIs, microservices, and applications under load in enterprise environments.

Tricentis Testim is a test automation platform that uses machine learning to create and maintain automated tests for web and mobile applications.

Tricentis Data Integrity is a testing solution focused on validating data integrity and compliance in enterprise systems, particularly in regulated industries.

Tricentis SeaLights provides quality intelligence by analyzing code changes, test coverage, and risk to help teams make release decisions.

Tricentis Vera is a tool for testing SAP pricing and configuration logic, including SAP Variant Configuration and S/4HANA pricing scenarios.

Tricentis Test Automation for ServiceNow is a testing solution deployed on the ServiceNow platform to validate workflows, configurations, and customizations.

Tricentis Test Automation for Salesforce is a testing solution designed to validate Salesforce applications, including custom objects, workflows, and integrations.
