= CAX =

CAX may refer tco:

- Carlisle Lake District Airport in Carlisle, Cumbria, England (IATA airport code: CAX)
- Combined arms Exercise (abbreviated as CAX)
- Computer-aided technologies (sometimes abbreviated as CAx)
- Container Availability Index (abbreviated as CAx)
