= Tsung =

Software-load testing tool

- Original author: Nicolas Niclausse
- Stable release: 1.8.0 / March 2, 2023
- Written in: Erlang
- Operating system: Cross-platform
- Type: Load Testing
- License: GNU General Public License 2.0
- Website: tsung.erlang-projects.org
- Repository: github.com/processone/tsung

Tsung (formerly known as idx-Tsunami) is a software load testing tool written in the Erlang language and distributed under the GPL license. It can currently stress test HTTP, WebDAV, LDAP, MySQL, PostgreSQL, SOAP and XMPP servers. Tsung can simulate hundreds of simultaneous users on a single system. It can also function in a clustered environment.

== Features ==
Features include:

- Several IP addresses can be used on a single machine using the underlying OS's IP Aliasing.
- OS monitoring (CPU, memory, and network traffic) using SNMP, munin-node agents or Erlang agents on remote servers.
- Different types of users can be simulated.
- Dynamic sessions can be described in XML (to retrieve, at runtime, an ID from the server output and use it later in the session).
- Simulated user thinktimes and the arrival rate can be randomized via probability distribution.
- HTML reports can be generated during the load to view response time measurements, server CPU, and other statistics.
