= TPCC =

TPCC may refer to:

- Transaction Processing Performance Council, a computer benchmarking industry group
- Taiwan Provincial Consultative Council, a former council in the Republic of China
- Tamil Nadu Pradesh Congress Committee, a state unit of the Indian National Congress in India
- Telangana Pradesh Congress Committee, a state unit of the Indian National Congress in India
- Tripura Pradesh Congress Committee, a state unit of the Indian National Congress in India
