= SOASTA =

SOASTA Inc.
- Company type: Subsidiary
- Industry: Software Testing
- Founded: 18 February 2006
- Founder: Ken Gardner (Executive Chairman)
- Headquarters: Mountain View, CA, United States of America
- Key people: Tom Lounibos (CEO)
- Owner: Akamai Technologies

SOASTA, Inc. is an American subsidiary of Akamai Technologies that provides services to test websites and web applications.

It is a provider of cloud-based testing services, and created a browser-based website testing product. Website tests include load testing, software performance testing, functional testing and user interface testing. SOASTA provides cloud website testing with its product CloudTest, which simulates thousands of users visiting a website simultaneously using the Amazon Elastic Compute Cloud (EC2) service. SOASTA allows customers to use predefined tests or create customized tests to automatically test their web applications.

The SOASTA platform further enables digital businesses to gain continuous performance insight into real user experiences on mobile and web devices in real time and at scale, using real user monitoring technology coupled with its mPulse product. SOASTA serves mobile application testing needs through its product TouchTest, which provides functional mobile app testing automation for multitouch, gesture-based mobile applications.

== History ==
SOASTA was founded by Ken Gardner and is based in Mountain View, California. Tom Lounibos has been CEO since September 2006.

In September 2008, SOASTA raised USD $6.4 million in financing from Formative Ventures, Canaan Partners, and The Entrepreneur's Fund.

In December 2008, SOASTA announced an alliance with SAVVIS to provide SAVVIS customer's with SOASTA's cloud testing services.

In October 2012, SOASTA became a Professional Services partner with ProtoTest.

In April 2017, Akamai completed a purchase of SOASTA in an all-cash transaction.
