= Pairwise =

Pairwise generally means "occurring in pairs" or "two at a time."

Pairwise may also refer to:

- Pairwise disjoint
- Pairwise independence of random variables
- Pairwise comparison, the process of comparing two entities to determine which is preferred
- All-pairs testing, also known as pairwise testing, a software testing method.
