= OpenSTA =

Type of web server benchmarking utility

- Developer: CYRANO
- Stable release: 1.4.4 / October 19, 2007
- Written in: C++
- Operating system: Microsoft Windows
- Type: Load Testing
- License: GNU General Public License 2.0
- Website: opensta.org

OpenSTA is a feature-rich GUI-based web server benchmarking utility that can perform scripted HTTP and HTTPS heavy load tests with performance measurements. It is freely available and distributable under the open source GNU General Public License. OpenSTA currently only runs on Microsoft Windows-based operating systems.

Scripts are recorded in a proprietary language called "SCL". It is a fairly simple coding language that provides support for custom functions, variable scopes, and random or sequential lists.

OpenSTA was originally written by Cyrano. Cyrano's intentions were to write commercial plug in modules and support for OpenSTA for performance testing non-web applications.

Note that the most recent version posted on the OpenSTA home page is 1.4.4, released 27 Oct, 2007.

== See also ==
- Load testing tools
