= RadView Software =

Software and load testing company

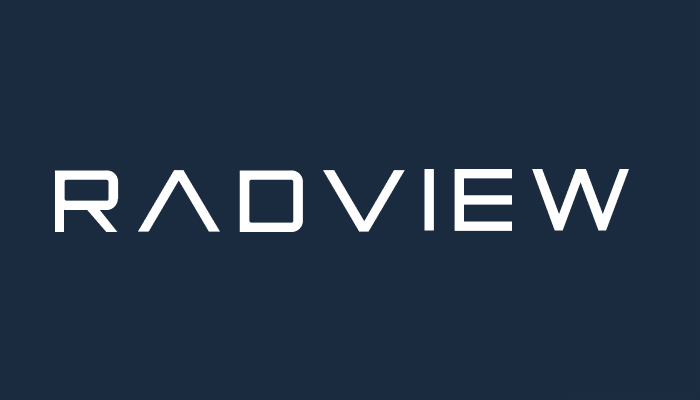
- Type: Public
- Traded as: RDVWF
- Industry: Software, Load testing
- Founded: 1993; 33 years ago
- Headquarters: Bridgewater, NJ
- Key people: CEO: Firas Matar; CTO: Danny Tsoubery
- Products: Radview WebLOAD, Radview TestAutomation
- Website: www.radview.com

RadView Software develops and offers enterprises test automation solution (Radview TestAutomation) and load testing tool and performance monitoring (Radview WebLoad) for web and mobile applications that allows companies to accelerate the development and deployment of their Web and Mobile applications and enables the implementation of their strategies involving their Websites. As of August 26, 2021, it had licensed its software to over 3,500 organizations.

== Products ==
RadView WebLOAD is a load testing and analysis tool that combines performance, scalability, and integrity as a single process for the verification of web applications. It scales to hundreds of thousands of virtual users, making it possible to test massive loads and report bottlenecks, constraints, and weak points within an application.

In 2021, RadView added RadView TestAutomation to its portfolio of products – an AI-based Test Automation solution through its acquisition of Shield34, an AI-based Test Automation company.

Radview TestAutomation is an intelligent Selenium-based platform for fast, easy, and reliable testing of web applications. It accelerates test development, cuts script maintenance work, eliminates redundant test failures, and shortens the time to reproduce and fix failed tests. Radview TestAutomation is fully compatible with Selenium, which allows the execution of any existing Selenium-based scripts immediately with no migration effort.

== History ==
RadView was founded in 1993 by Ilan Kinreich, former co-founder of Mercury Interactive. In 1996, the company launched WebLOAD to meet the need for testing web and mobile applications under load peak conditions. In August 2000, RadView completed an initial public offering, followed by private financing from Fortissimo Capital, Meitav, and others. In April 2021, RadView acquired an AI-based Test Automation company, adding RadView TestAutomation to its portfolio of products.

== See also ==
- Load testing
- Test automation
- Cloud testing
- Artificial intelligence
- Software performance testing
- WebLOAD
- Soak testing
- Stress testing
- Web testing
