= Internet application management =

Internet application management is a term used in the Web Hosting industry to describe services which address scalability and performance issues often arising at the system level during application deployments. Starting in 2009, the DevOps movement began to publicize the importance of cross-departmental integration between development and IT operations and the relational effects non-collaboration has on the various stages of business production.

== Overview ==
Internet application management services address this “grey area” by evaluating performance using standard web application metrics such as page load times, concurrency capability, and slow queries as a starting point. These optimizations and tuning of a web application can be achieved through first creating benchmarks using tools such as Apachebench or J-Meter through load simulation. The output of load testing runs can then be used to identify file system and application performance improvements to be made not only at the application level, but at the operating system level - something often overlooked in the development process.

Another essential component of internet application management is the ongoing optimizations made to improve subsequent iterative application deployments, in addition to the in-depth monitoring of critical services and overall application performance.

== See also ==
- Clustered web hosting
- Web Hosting Magazine
