= KBE =

KBE may refer to:

- Knight Commander of the Most Excellent Order of the British Empire, post-nominal letters
- Knowledge-based engineering
