= SoapUI =

Open-source web service testing application

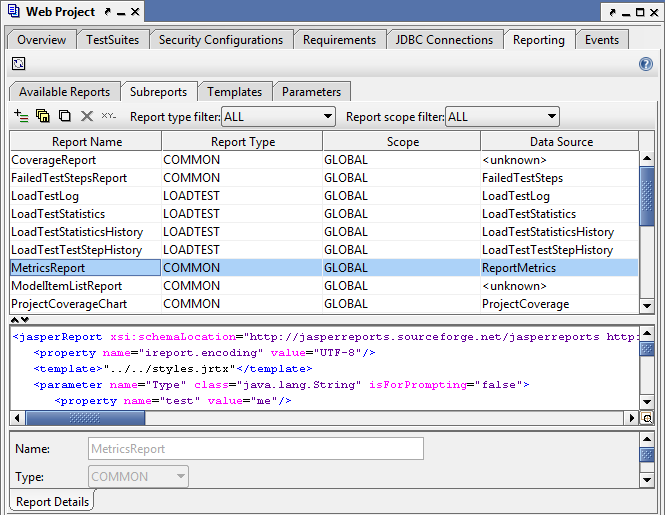
- SoapUI Open Source
- Developer: SmartBear Software
- Release: 2005; 21 years ago
- Stable release: 5.10.0 / 2 June 2026; 4 months ago
- Written in: Java, Groovy
- Available in: English
- Type: SOA, web Services
- License: EUPL (SoapUI Open Source); Proprietary (ReadyAPI)
- Website: soapui.org
- Repository: github.com/SmartBear/soapui

SoapUI is an open-source web service testing application for Simple Object Access Protocol (SOAP) and representational state transfers (REST). Its functionality covers web service inspection, invoking, development, simulation and mocking, functional testing, load and compliance testing. A commercial version, ReadyAPI (formerly SoapUI Pro), which mainly focuses on features designed to enhance productivity, was also developed by Eviware Software AB. In 2011, SmartBear Software acquired Eviware.

SoapUI was initially released to SourceForge in September 2005. It is free software, licensed under the terms of the European Union Public License. Since the initial release, SoapUI has been downloaded more than 2,000,000 times. It is built entirely on the Java platform, and uses Swing for the user interface. This means that SoapUI is cross-platform. Today, SoapUI also supports IDEA, Eclipse, and NetBeans.

SoapUI can test SOAP and REST web services, JMS, AMF, as well as make any HTTP(S) and JDBC calls.

== Features ==
=== SoapUI ===
Core features include web services:

- inspection
- invoking
- development
- simulation and mocking
- functional, compliance and security testing

=== ReadyAPI ===
ReadyAPI is the commercial enterprise version. ReadyAPI adds a number of productivity enhancements to the SoapUI core, which are designed to ease many recurring tasks when working with SoapUI.

Feature	Benefit	Ref.
WSDL coverage	Analyze request/response messages to see how well a WSDL contract is being tested/mocked/used.	
WSDL refactoring	Automatically update requests/response/assertions when the underlying WSDL changes.	
Composite projects	Work together in a team on your Web service testing projects.	
Requirements management	Manage, import, and export project requirements and link them to test cases.	
Form-based request editor	To ease the editing and understanding of request messages for both technical and non-technical users.	
Overview message viewer	To get an overview of the corresponding response/mock-request/monitored message.	
Tree-based request/response editor	To ease the navigation and understanding of larger messages.	
Table inspector	To quickly give an overview of tabular message content.	
Schema inspector	To ease inspection and debugging of message content.	
XML inspector	To ease inspection and debugging of message content.	
Doc inspector	To ease understanding of message content.	
DataSource TestStep	To ease the creation of data-driven tests.	
DataSink TestStep	Eases collection of data to be used in subsequent tests or for external reporting.	
DataGen TestStep	To simplify comprehensive testing of complex interfaces.	
Property transfer wizards	To ease the creation of complex test cases / message flows.	
XPath Assertion Wizards	To ease the creation of XPath assertions for TestRequest and MockResponse steps.	
XPath Wizards	Eases creation of XPath expressions in many situations.	
Integrated reporting	To provide summaries of functional testing for tracking and governance.	
Groovy script library	Eases reuse and scripting of complex scenarios.	
Tabbed desktop	Eases desktop management with multiple editors.	
API Discovery	Ability to create SoapUI tests based on captured HTTP traffic that was generated from user actions (e.g. from browsing a website)	

== Awards ==
SoapUI has been given a number of awards. These include:

- Jolt Awards 2014: The Best Testing Tools
- ATI Automation Honors, 2009
- InfoWorld Best of Open Source Software Award, 2008
- SOAWorld Readers' Choice Award, 2007

== See also ==
- Apache JMeter
- Automated testing
- List of unit testing frameworks
- LoadUI
- Software testing
- System testing
- Test case
- Test-driven development
- TestComplete
- xUnit – a family of unit testing frameworks
