= WebLOAD =

Software testing tool

- Developer: RadView Software
- Operating system: Microsoft Windows, Linux
- Type: Load Testing Tool
- License: Proprietary software
- Website: www.radview.com

WebLOAD is load testing tool, performance testing, stress test web applications. This web and mobile load testing and analysis tool is from RadView Software. Load testing tool WebLOAD combines performance, scalability, and integrity as a single process for the verification of web and mobile applications. It can simulate hundreds of thousands of concurrent users making it possible to test large loads and report bottlenecks, constraints, and weak points within an application.

Using its multi-protocol support, WebLOAD simulates traffic of hundreds of thousands of users and provides analysis data on how the application behaves under load. WebLOAD monitors and incorporates statistics from the various components of the system under test: servers, application server, database, network, load-balancer, firewall, etc., and can also monitor the End User Experience and Service Level Agreement (SLA) compliance in production environments.

== History ==
WebLOAD was first launched in August 1997. Since its launch, RadView has released more than 20 versions of WebLOAD.

Version	Release date	Notes
8.5	June 2010	AJAX-based applications / Side-by-Side Views
8.6	December 2010	New Parameterization Manager / Statistical Correlation
9.0	August 2012	Load testing from the Cloud / Probing Client statistics / Extended Validation engine
10.0	May 2013	New User interface and user experience / Mobile support / IPv6 / Monitoring – Linux via SSH
10.1	December 2013	Plug-in for Jenkins / Integration with AppDynamics
10.2	December 2014	Web Dashboard / WebSockets testing / Integration with Perfecto Mobile / Integration with Dynatrace / JSON Support
10.3	October 2015	Push technology support / Load testing with Selenium (software) WebDriver / Integration with Git repository / XMLHttpRequest Object Support
10.3.1	February 2016	Ability to freeze and unfreeze a test during execution / Integration with New Relic / Ranorex and Original Software's Test Drive Support

== Features ==
WebLOAD's features include:

- IDE An integrated development environment for visually recording, editing & debugging load test scripts. WebLOAD's proxy-based recorder records HTTP activity. Test are generated in JavaScript and can be enhanced and edited using various tools in the IDE.
- Correlation Automatic correlation of dynamic values such as Session IDs, enables a script to be executed dynamically with multiple virtual clients.
- Load Generation WebLOAD generates load from on-premises machines or from the cloud.
- Analytics A set of predefined analysis reports provides performance data, helping users identify bottlenecks. Reports and analysis data can also be viewed remotely via a customizable Web Dashboard.
- PMM Collects server-side statistics during test runs, providing users with additional data for root-cause analysis.
- Web Dashboard Analyzing performance test results from any browser or Mobile device.

== See also ==
- Load testing
- Cloud testing
- Software performance testing
- RadView Software
- Soak testing
- Stress testing
- Web testing
