= ApacheBench =

Command line tool for Apache HTTP Server

ApacheBench (ab is the real program file name) is a single-threaded command line computer program used for benchmarking (measuring the performance of) HTTP web servers. Originally it was used to test the Apache HTTP Server but it is generic enough to test any web server supporting HTTP/1.0 or HTTP/1.1 protocol versions.

The ab tool is written in C and it comes bundled with the standard Apache source distribution, and like the Apache web server itself, is free, open source software and distributed under the terms of the Apache License.

== History ==
The original program was named zb "ZeusBench V1.0" and it was written by Adam Twiss (Zeus Technology), in 1996, in order to test performance of Zeus Web Server. Soon later Twiss licensed (donated) that program to the Apache Group so that the derived program was renamed ab "ApacheBench".

Since 1997, 1998 ab has been further developed and maintained, as a support program included in Apache HTTP server, from version 1.0 (1997,1998) to version 2.3 (2021) and later.

== Example usage ==
ab -n 10000 -c 10 "http://localhost/index.html"

This will execute 10000 HTTP GET requests, processing up to 10 requests concurrently, to the specified URL, in this example, http://localhost/index.html which requires that a web server is running on port 80 of the same computer where ab is run.

For an extended example of ab output see also ab output for Squid performance tuning.

== Concurrency versus threads ==
Note that ApacheBench will only use one operating system thread regardless of the concurrency level (specified by the -c parameter). In some cases, especially when benchmarking high-capacity servers, a single instance of ApacheBench can itself be a bottleneck. When using ApacheBench on hardware with multiple processor cores, additional instances of ApacheBench may be used in parallel to more fully saturate the target URL.

== Detecting ApacheBench ==
The ApacheBench User Agent string is ApacheBench/MAJOR.MINOR where MAJOR and MINOR represent the major and minor version numbers of the program. It is usually not correctly categorised by web server log analysers such as Webalizer or AWStats, so running ApacheBench with a great number of requests may skew the results of the reports generated by these programs.

== See also ==
- Internet Application Management
- Web server benchmarking
