= LoadUI =

- loadUI Pro screenshot
- Developer(s): Open-source standard version, SmartBear Software Pro version
- Initial release: 2010; 15 years ago
- Stable release: 2.6.8 / February 21, 2014; 11 years ago
- Written in: Java, JavaFX, Groovy
- Operating system: Cross-platform
- Type: Load testing, SOA, Web Services
- License: EUPL
- Website: web.archive.org/web/20170929155435/https://www.loadui.org/

LoadUI is a load testing software, targeted mainly at web services. LoadUI runs on Windows, Linux and Mac OS. LoadUI allows users to test the speed and scalability of APIs, preview API performance behaviors before releasing to production environments.

== History ==
There was an open source version, but it was discontinued in July 2014. In 2015 LoadUI became a part of ReadyAPI under the name LoadUI Pro. Most of the user interface as well as all JavaFX eye-candies were removed. Use interface was simplified and divided into five visual parts. Old projects could now be imported from the file with some limitations.

It has been superseded by LoadUI Pro in the ReadyAPI platform.

== Features ==
Features include integration with the functional testing tool SoapUI and load distribution. Functionality can be added at runtime using plugins created by third-party developers.

List of features and capabilities:

- Cloud-based load tests
- Parallel load testing
- Server Monitoring
- Reuse existing functional tests
- Distributed load generators
- Isolated load testing
- Endpoint load testing

== See also ==
- SoapUI
