= Login VSI =

Workplace software

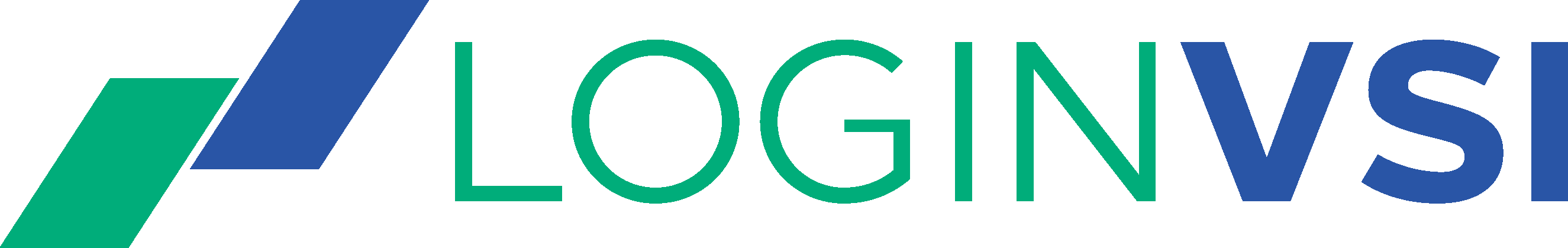
- Developer: Login VSI Inc.
- Stable release: 4.6 / July 29, 2021
- Operating system: Microsoft Windows
- Type: Automated Testing Platform
- License: Proprietary
- Website: www.loginvsi.com

Login VSI is an American software vendor. Its flagship product, Login Enterprise, is an automated testing platform that tests desktop user experience. Login Enterprise includes standard “out-of-the-box” application template workloads.

Login VSI evolved from the consulting firm Login Consultants. The first product was commercially released in 2008 and was free. As large enterprises began adopting the product, the need to commercialize the product became evident. Login VSI was formed in 2012.

In 2016, Login VSI announced the public launch of its second product, Login PI. Login PI is an active monitoring tool that constantly runs a single virtual user, to monitor performance and availability of virtual desktop infrastructures and associated business applications. Both products use virtual users (or synthetic users) to test systems, without the need for real users.

In 2018, Login VSI announced the Login VSI Enterprise Edition (a combination of Login VSI and Login PI), and the Login VSI Vendor Edition (focused on the industry-standard tests done by this audience).
