= Cloud testing =

Form of software testing

Cloud testing is a form of software testing in which web applications use cloud computing environments (a "cloud") to simulate real-world user traffic.

== Steps ==
Companies simulate real world Web users by using cloud testing services that are provided by cloud service vendors such as Advaltis, Compuware, HP, Keynote Systems, Neotys, RadView and SOASTA. Once user scenarios are developed and the test is designed, these service providers leverage cloud servers (provided by cloud platform vendors such as Amazon.com, Google, Rackspace, Microsoft, etc.) to generate web traffic that originates from around the world. Once the test is complete, the cloud service providers deliver results and analytics back to corporate IT professionals through real-time dashboards for a complete analysis of how their applications and the internet will perform during peak volumes.

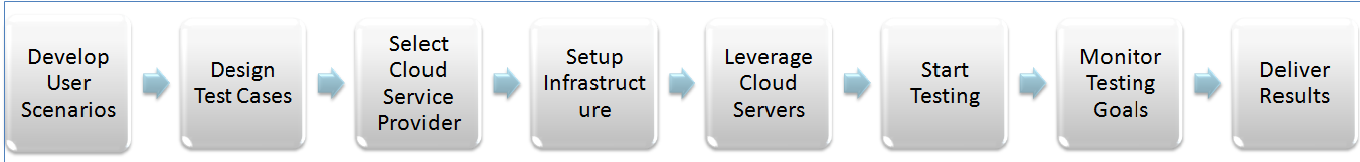
Steps for Cloud Testing

== Applications ==
Cloud testing is often seen as only performance or load tests, however, as discussed earlier it covers many other types of testing. Cloud computing itself is often referred to as the marriage of software as a service (SaaS) and utility computing. In regard to test execution, the software offered as a service may be a transaction generator and the cloud provider's infrastructure software, or may just be the latter. Distributed Systems and Parallel Systems mainly use this approach for testing, because of their inherent complex nature. D-Cloud is an example of such a software testing environment.

== Tools ==
Leading cloud computing service providers include, among others, Amazon, Microsoft, Google, RadView, Skytap, HP and SOASTA.

== Benefits ==
The ability and cost to simulate web traffic for software testing purposes has been an inhibitor to overall web reliability. The low cost and accessibility of the cloud's extremely large computing resources provides the ability to replicate real world usage of these systems by geographically distributed users, executing wide varieties of user scenarios, at scales previously unattainable in traditional testing environments. Minimal start-up time along with quality assurance can be achieved by cloud testing.

Following are some of the key benefits:

- Reduction in capital expenditure
- Highly scalable
