= Siege (software) =

- Developer(s): Jeffrey Fulmer, et al
- Stable release: 3.0.9
- Repository: github.com/JoeDog/siege/
- Available in: English
- Type: Load testing
- License: GPLv3 or later
- Website: joedog.org/siege-home

Siege is a Hypertext Transfer Protocol (HTTP) and HTTPS load testing and web server benchmarking utility developed by Jeffrey Fulmer. It was designed to let web developers measure the performance of their code under stress, to see how it will stand up to load on the internet.

It is licensed under the GNU General Public License (GNU GPL) open-source software license, which means it is free to use, modify, and distribute.

Siege can stress a single URL or it can read many URLs into memory and stress them simultaneously. It supports basic authentication, cookies, HTTP, HTTPS and FTP protocols.

== Performance measures ==
Performance measures include elapsed time of the test, the amount of data transferred (including headers), the response time of the server, its transaction rate, its throughput, its concurrency and the number of times it returned OK. These measures are quantified and reported at the end of each run.

This is a sample of siege output:

Ben: $ siege -u shemp.whoohoo.com/Admin.jsp -d1 -r10 -c25
..Siege 2.65 2006/05/11 23:42:16
..Preparing 25 concurrent users for battle.
The server is now under siege...done
Transactions: 250 hits
Elapsed time: 14.67 secs
Data transferred: 448,000 bytes
Response time: 0.43 secs
Transaction rate: 17.04 trans/sec
Throughput: 30538.51 bytes/sec
Concurrency: 7.38
Status code 200: 250
Successful transactions: 250
Failed transactions: 0

Siege has essentially three modes of operation: regression, internet simulation and brute force. It can read a large number of URLs from a configuration file and run through them incrementally (regression) or randomly (internet simulation). Or the user may simply pound a single URL with a runtime configuration at the command line (brute force).

== Platform support ==
Siege was written on Linux and has been successfully ported to AIX, BSD, HP-UX, and Solaris. It compiles on most UNIX System V variants and on most newer BSD systems.
