= NeoLoad =

Automated performance testing platform

- Developer(s): Neotys
- Stable release: NeoLoad 7.9
- Written in: Java
- Operating system: Microsoft Windows, Linux, Solaris, macOS
- Available in: English, French
- Type: Load testing
- License: Proprietary software
- Website: neotys.com

NeoLoad (load and stress testing) is an automated performance testing platform for enterprise organizations continuously testing from APIs to applications. It provides testers and developers automatic test design and maintenance, the most realistic simulation of user behavior, fast root cause analysis and built-in integrations with the entire software development lifecycle toolchain. It is designed, developed and marketed by Neotys, a privately owned company based in Gémenos, France.

== Features ==
NeoLoad works by simulating traffic (up to millions of users) to determine application performance under load, analyze response times and pinpoint the number of the simultaneous users which the Internet, intranet or mobile application can handle. Tests can be performed from inside the firewall (in-house) or from the cloud.

In addition to simulating network traffic, it also simulates end-user transaction activity including common tasks like submitting forms or executing searches by emulating "virtual" users accessing web application modules. It provides the performance information required to troubleshoot bottlenecks for tuning the application and the supporting servers. It monitors the newest web, database and application servers such as JBoss application server, HP-UX 11, Weblogic, WebSphere, Apache Tomcat, and MySQL database.

Its "scripts" are developed via a GUI, which provides conditions, loops, and other programming structures. JavaScript may be inserted for more advanced uses, such as password encryption.

- It supports basic, digest, NTLM and form-based authentication.
- It can record HTTP and HTTPS requests, play them back and supports client certificate authentication.
- It supports ActiveX components as long as communication with the server is via the HTTP protocol.
- It supports any type of web application including those using J2EE, .NET, AJAX, Flex, Silverlight, GWT, SOAP, PHP, Push technology, etc. as long as they are HTTP 1.0 or 1.1 compliant.
- It supports hybrid and native mobile applications.
- It supports video (HTTP streaming and RTMP).
- JSON and SPDY protocol are also supported.
- It emulates Network conditions (latency, packet loss and bandwidth).

On March 30, 2021, Neotys was acquired by Tricentis.
