= Web Hosting Magazine =

Web Hosting Magazine was a web hosting industry print magazine that published from 2000 to 2002. It spawned a companion tradeshow, Web Hosting Expo. Its founders and editors were Dmitri Eroshenko and Isabel Wang. It was published by Infotonics Media. The magazine was written and edited with a deliberately "edgy" style, designed to appeal to the primarily young and male constituency of the ISP industry.

In 2003, Ping! Zine Web Hosting Magazine was launched, based on the concept of Web Hosting Magazine, and Isabel Wang came on board as a main part of the Editorial Board. This magazine continued with the edgy style.
