= Neotys =

- Type: Private
- Industry: Software
- Founded: 2005
- Defunct: 2021
- Headquarters: Gémenos, France
- Number of employees: 60+
- Website: www.neotys.com

Neotys was a software company specialising in performance and load testing tools for information systems. The company develops NeoLoad, an automated performance testing platform used by enterprise organisations for testing applications and APIs.

The company was purchased by Tricentis in 2021.

== History ==
Neotys was founded in 2005 by a group of software developers and IT project managers who recognized a demand for a software to test the performance of web applications before launch.

From its early years, Neotys expanded its activities outside France, securing its first client in 2005 in the United States with AES Corporation. The company later developed its commercial presence abroad through sales agents before opening its first foreign subsidiary in 2009.

In 2014, Neotys raised €3 million from Ardian and Bpifrance, its only external funding round, to support sales and marketing activities outside France. The company subsequently opened a subsidiary in India and entered the Japanese market through a distribution partnership with Tech Matrix.

Neotys has delivered software to more than 2000 clients in 70 countries, with exports accounting for more than 75% of the company's annual turnover.

In March 2021, the Austrian software testing company Tricentis purchased Neotys for an undisclosed amount. The two companies already had an existing partnership. At the time of the purchase, Neotys claimed 600 customers for its NeoLoad platform.
