= Transaction Processing Performance Council =

Non-profit organization

- Formation: 1988
- Type: Not-for-profit
- Headquarters: San Francisco, California, US
- Members: Hardware and software vendors, market researchers, educational institutions, consultants
- Website: www.tpc.org

The Transaction Processing Performance Council (TPC), founded in 1988, is a non-profit organization founded to define benchmarks for transaction processing and databases, and to publish objective, verifiable TPC performance data to the industry. TPC benchmarks are used in evaluating the performance of computer systems, and TPC publishes the results.

The first benchmark from the organization, known as TPC-A, was released in November 1989. It simulated a simple accounting system and was based on earlier work by Tandem Computers' Debit-Credit program. Companies would run this program on their system and submit the results along with details about the machine and the costs of buying and maintaining it for a period of five years.

As computer power grew exponentially during this period, TPC-A was considered too simple to simulate real-world workflows even as it was published. A new standard, TPC-C, was released in July 1992. This was based on Digital's Order-Entry program which simulated a multi-site warehousing company performing a variety of queries against a much more complex database. TPC-C remains in widespread use to this day.

The TPC has released a number of new benchmarks since then. TPC-E, released in February 2007, is intended to be a modern replacement for TPC-C, including a wider variety of transaction types and a more complex database structure. Although it sees widespread use, TPC-C also remains widely used. They have also published a series of more specialized benchmarks for decision support, virtualization and big data, among others.

== Conference Series ==
In 2009 the TPC initiated an International Technology Conference Series on Performance Evaluation and Benchmarking (TPCTC), a forum for industry experts and researchers to discuss and develop techniques for evaluation, measurement and characterization of modern application systems. The conference series was founded in 2009 by Raghunath Nambiar of Cisco and Meikel Poess in 2009.

- TPCTC 2009, in conjunction with VLDB 2009 on August 24, 2009 in Lyon, France.
- TPCTC 2010, in conjunction with VLDB 2010 on September 17, 2010 in Singapore.
- TPCTC 2011, in conjunction with VLDB 2011 on August 29, 2011 in Seattle, Washington.
- TPCTC 2012, in conjunction with VLDB 2012 on August 27, 2012 in Istanbul, Turkey.
- TPCTC 2013, in conjunction with VLDB 2013 on August 26, 2013 in Trento, Italy.
- TPCTC 2014, in conjunction with VLDB 2014 on September 5, 2014 in Hangzhou, China.
- TPCTC 2015, in conjunction with VLDB 2015 on August 31, 2015 in Kohala Coast, Hawaii.
- TPCTC 2016, in conjunction with VLDB 2016 on September 5, 2016 in New Delhi, India.

== Standards ==
- TPC-C – On-line transaction processing (since 1992)
- TPC-H – Ad-hoc decision support system (since 1999)
- TPC-E – Complex on-line transaction processing (since 2006)
- TPC-DS – Complex decisions support system (since 2011)
- TPC-DI – Data integration (since 2013)
- TPCx-HS – Industry's first standard for benchmarking Big Data (Hadoop) systems (since 2014)

== Obsolete benchmarks ==
- TPC-A – Measures performance in update-intensive database environments typical in on-line transaction processing applications. (Obsolete as of June 6, 1995)
- TPC-App – An application server and web services benchmark.
- TPC-B – Measures throughput in terms of how many transactions per second a system can perform. (Obsolete as of June 6, 1995)
- TPC-D – Represents a broad range of decision support applications that require complex, long running queries against large complex data structures. (Obsolete as of April 6, 1999)
- TPC-R – A business reporting, decision support benchmark. (Obsolete as of January 1, 2005)
- TPC-W – A transactional web e-Commerce benchmark. (Obsolete as of April 28, 2005)
