= TPC-W =

TPC-W was a web server and database performance benchmark, proposed by Transaction Processing Performance Council.

This benchmark defined the complete Web-based shop for searching, browsing and ordering books. The system under testing needed to provide the implementation of this shop. TPC-W standard describes all pages that must be present in the shop (including sample HTML code), interaction graphs (how the user navigates between the pages), transition tables (that is the probability that the user will move from page A to page B) and database schema. In addition, the standard provided generator to produce synthetic images (book covers) that the system under testing needed to show in the virtual shop. Standard also describes how random strings and random numbers must be generated.

During testing, the server was visited by a growing number of web-bots, each simulating individual customer. The pause between web interactions from the single customer and the number of total pages each customer visits per session are random numbers that must follow asymmetric distribution, specified by the standard. The navigation pattern is defined by three transition tables that differ in accordance with the preferred plans of the user (shopping mix, browsing mix and ordering mix). The main measured parameter was WIPS, the number of web interactions per second that the system is capable to deliver.

It was also possible to visit and actually use the virtual shop with the ordinary browser.

The official TPC-W page in the past included performance comparisons, providing information, how well the virtual shop performs when implemented with various development platforms and running on various web servers and operating systems. This is information that is no longer available from the web site.

While discontinued, TPC-W is still used in universities for teaching, requiring students to implement TPC-W - compliant shop and perform benchmarking .

== Other web application benchmarks ==
1. RUBBoS
2. RuBiS
