= IntelliCorp =

American software company

- Industry: Software
- Founded: Menlo Park, California (1980)
- Headquarters: San Jose, California, US
- Products: LiveCompare, LiveModel and LiveInterface; legacy products= PowerModel (Kappa), LiveModel (Object Management Workbench), Kappa-PC and KEE
- Footnotes; Founders (Douglas Brutlag, Peter Friedland, Edward Feigenbaum)

IntelliCorp (IC) was an American software company based in Silicon Valley. It sold its assets including LiveCompare, LiveModel and LiveInterface to Tricentis in May 2019.

== History ==
Founded in 1980, IC marketed an early expert system environment (Knowledge Engineering Environment – KEE) for development and deployment of knowledge systems on the Lisp machines that had several advanced features, such as truth maintenance. KEE used the backward-chaining method of Mycin which had been developed at Stanford. While moving KEE functionality to the PC, IC created one of the early object-oriented technologies for commercial programming development environments (LiveModel).

The company was also one of the UML Partners, a consortium which helped develop the standards for UML, the Unified Modeling Language.

In May 2019, IC completed the sale of its assets including LiveCompare, LiveModel and LiveInterface to Tricentis.
