= Test data =

Test data are sets of inputs or information used to verify the correctness, performance, and reliability of software systems. Test data encompass various types, such as positive and negative scenarios, edge cases, and realistic user scenarios, and aims to exercise different aspects of the software to uncover bugs and validate its behavior. Test data is also used in regression testing to verify that new code changes or enhancements do not introduce unintended side effects or break existing functionalities.

== Background ==
Test data may be used to verify that a given set of inputs to a function produces an expected result. Alternatively, data can be used to challenge the program's ability to handle unusual, extreme, exceptional, or unexpected inputs.

Test data can be produced in a focused or systematic manner, as is typically the case in domain testing, or through less focused approaches, such as high-volume randomized automated tests. Test data can be generated by the tester or by a program or function that assists the tester. It can be recorded for reuse or used only once. Test data may be created manually, using data generation tools (often based on randomness), or retrieved from an existing production environment. The data set may consist of synthetic (fake) data, but ideally, it should include representative (real) data.

== Limitations ==
Due to privacy regulations such as GDPR, PCI, and the HIPAA, the use of privacy-sensitive personal data for testing is restricted. However, anonymized (and preferably subsetted) production data may be used as representative data for testing and development. Programmers may also choose to generate synthetic data as an alternative to using real or anonymized data. While synthetic data can offer significant advantages, such as enhanced privacy and flexibility, it also comes with limitations. For instance, generating synthetic data that accurately reflects real-world complexity can be challenging. There is also a risk of synthetic data not fully capturing the nuances of real data, potentially leading to gaps in test coverage.

== Domain testing ==
Domain testing is a set of techniques focusing on test data. This includes identifying critical inputs, values at the boundaries between equivalence classes, and combinations of inputs that drive the system toward specific outputs. Domain testing helps ensure that various scenarios are effectively tested, including edge cases and unusual conditions.

== See also ==
- Software testing
- Unit test
- Test plan
- Test suite
- Scenario test
- Session-based testing
