= Test vector =

In computer science and engineering, a test vector is a set of inputs provided to a system in order to test that system. In software development, test vectors are a methodology of software testing and software verification and validation.

== Rationale ==
In computer science and engineering, a system acts as a computable function. An example of a specific function could be $y = f(x)$ where $y$ is the output of the system and $x$ is the input; however, most systems' inputs are not one-dimensional. When the inputs are multi-dimensional, we could say that the system takes the form $y = f(x_1, x_2, ...)$ ; however, we can generalize this equation to a general form $Y = C(X)$ where $Y$ is the result of the system's execution, $C$ belongs to the set of computable functions, and $X$ is an input vector. While testing the system, various test vectors must be used to examine the system's behavior with differing inputs.

== Example ==
For example, consider a login page with two input fields: a username field and a password field. In that case, the login system can be described as:

$y = L(u,p)$

with $y \in \{ true , false \}$ and $u,p \in \{ String \}$, with $true$ designating login successful, and $false$ designating login failure, respectively.

Making things more generic, we can suggest that the function $L$ takes input as a 2-dimensional vector and outputs a one-dimensional vector (scalar). This can be written in the following way:-

$Y = L(X)$

with $X = [ x_1, x_2 ]=[u,p] \; ; \; Y = [ y_1 ]$

In this case, $X$ is called the input vector, and $Y$ is called the output vector.

In order to test the login page, it is necessary to pass some sample input vectors $\{X_1, X_2, X_3, ...\}$. In this context $X_i$ is called a test vector.

Alternatively, the concatenation of $X$ and $Y$, e.g., $[ x_1, x_2, y_1 ]$, can be called a test vector.

== See also ==
- Automatic test pattern generation
