= Apache JMeter =

Open-source performance testing software

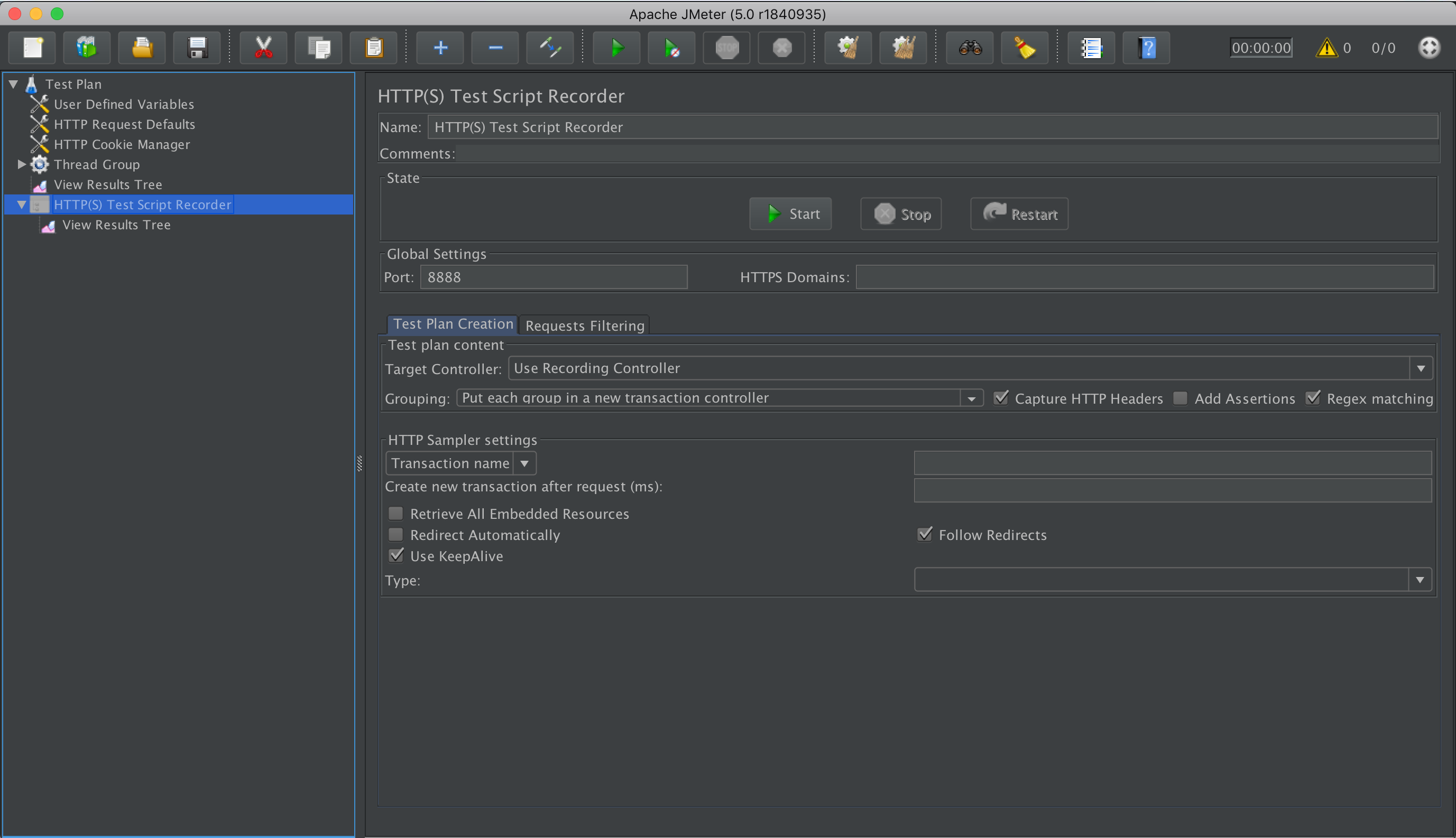
- Screenshot of Apache JMeter 5.0 with HTTP(S) Test Script Recorder element
- Developer: Apache Software Foundation
- Stable release: 5.6.3 / 9 January 2024; 2 years ago
- Written in: Java
- Type: Load testing
- License: Apache License 2.0
- Website: jmeter.apache.org
- Repository: github.com/apache/jmeter

Apache JMeter is an Apache project that can be used as a load testing tool for analyzing and measuring the performance of a variety of services, with a focus on web applications.

JMeter can be used as a unit-test tool for JDBC database connections, FTP, LDAP, web services, JMS, HTTP, generic TCP connections and OS-native processes. One can also configure JMeter as a monitor, although this is typically used as a basic monitoring solution rather than advanced monitoring. It can be used for some functional testing as well. Additionally JMeter supports integration with Selenium, which allows it to run automation scripts alongside performance or load tests

JMeter supports variable parameterization, assertions (response validation), per-thread cookies, configuration variables and a variety of reports.

JMeter architecture is based on plugins. Most of its "out of the box" features are implemented with plugins

== JMeter Plugins ==
JMeter Plugins is an independent project for Apache JMeter. Each plugin serves a different purpose while expediting the process of creating and executing JMeter Test Plan. Users can install plugins via the Plugin Manager.

== See also ==
- iMacros
- Performance engineering
- Selenium (software)
- Software performance testing
- Software testing
- Web server benchmarking
