= Load testing =

Process of putting demand on a system and measuring its response

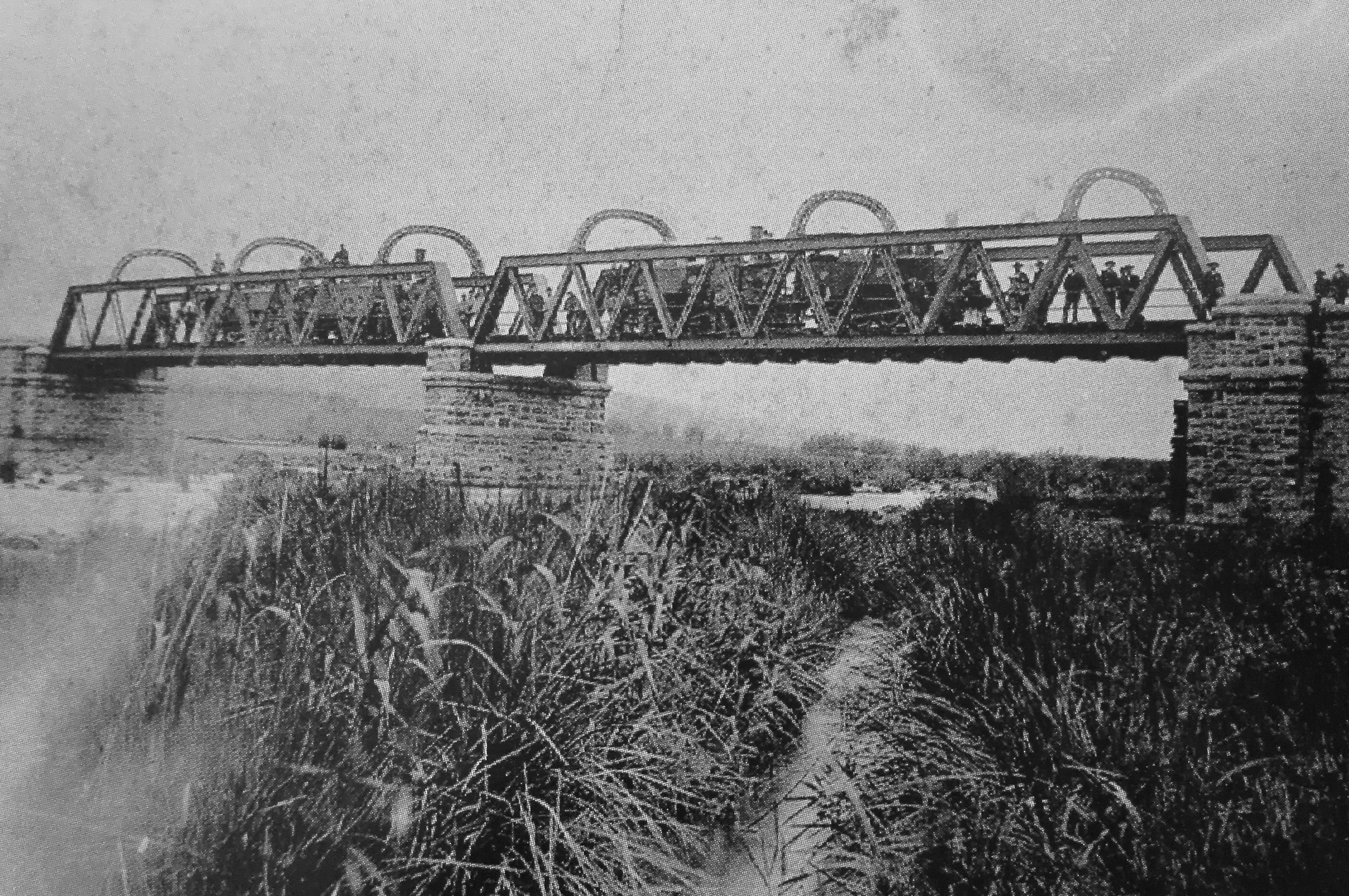
Load testing a railroad bridge, 1883

Load testing is the process of putting demand on a structure or system and measuring its response.

== Physical load testing ==
Symbol used in geotechnical drawings

Many types of machinery, engines, structures, and motors are load tested. The load may be at a designated safe working load (SWL), full load, or at an aggravated level of load. The governing contract, technical specification or test method contains the details of conducting the test. The purpose of a mechanical load test is to verify that all the component parts of a structure including materials, base-fixings are fit for task and loading it is designed for.

Several types of load testing are employed

- Static testing is when a designated constant load is applied for a specified time.
- Dynamic testing is when a variable or moving load is applied.
- Cyclical testing consists of repeated loading and unloading for specified cycles, durations and conditions.

The Supply of Machinery (Safety) Regulation 1992 UK state that load testing is undertaken before the equipment is put into service for the first time. Performance testing applies a safe working load (SWL), or other specified load, for a designated time in a governing test method, specification, or contract. Under the Lifting Operations and Lifting Equipment Regulations 1998 UK load testing after the initial test is required if a major component is replaced, if the item is moved from one location to another or as dictated by the competent person.

== Software load testing ==
The term load testing or stress testing is used in different ways in the professional software testing community. Load testing generally refers to the practice of modeling the expected usage of a software program by simulating multiple users accessing the program concurrently.

== See also ==
- Internet Application Management
- Soak testing
- Stress testing
- Structural testing
- System testing
- Web testing
- Web server benchmarking
