= JS++ =

Web programming language

- Paradigm: Multi-paradigm: Imperative, structured, object-oriented, functional, generic
- Family: ECMAScript
- Designed by: Roger Poon, Anton Rapetov
- Developer: Onux
- First appeared: October 8, 2011; 15 years ago
- Stable release: 0.10.0 / December 10, 2021; 4 years ago
- Typing discipline: Gradual, static, dynamic
- Scope: lexical
- License: BSD
- Filename extensions: .jspp, .js++, .jpp
- Website: www.onux.com/jspp

Influenced by
- C, C++, C#, Java, JavaScript

JS++ is a programming language for web development that extends JavaScript with a sound type system. It includes imperative, object-oriented, functional, and generic programming features. It is free and open-source software released under a BSD license.

== History ==
JS++ first appeared on October 8, 2011. The modern implementation was announced at DeveloperWeek 2016 and released on May 31, 2016. The language is designed by Roger Poon and Anton Rapetov.

== Features ==
=== Sound gradual type system ===
Since JS++ is a superset of JavaScript, declaring data types for variables is optional. However, when types are declared, the types are enforced at both compile time and runtime. The type system is provably sound and will not leak runtime TypeErrors, despite being able to import libraries from untyped JavaScript.

Type annotations in JS++ use the traditional C/C++ syntax:

int x = 1;
var y = 2;
bool z = true;

Notably, this differs from TypeScript and ActionScript, which use a more verbose style:

let x: number = 1;
let y: any = 2;
let z: boolean = true;

The type system in JS++ is sound for ECMAScript and DOM API corner cases, including host objects, dynamic key-value pairs, Comet, JScript conditional compilation, dynamic return types, ActiveX, ECMAScript for XML, web browser garbage collector and cyclic reference counting bugs, conditional logic, and other edge and corner cases. This differs from other JavaScript supersets where types are optional and discarded at runtime via type erasure, such as in TypeScript.

=== Importing JavaScript libraries ===
JS++ can use JavaScript libraries using the one-line external statement as in the following example from the homepage of JS++:

import System;
// Import JavaScript libraries in one line of code
external jQuery, $;

class Example {
    public Example() {
        // Nearly NO learning curve
        // You can keep writing regular JavaScript
        var a = 0, random = Math.random();
        // Integer types and other primitives
        // ... enable fast (optimized) and clear code
        byte[] rgbColors = [0xFF, 0xFA, 0xFF];
    }

    public void showMessage(int id, string text) {
        // 100% compatible with regular JavaScript
        jQuery("#msgbox").show();
        $("#msgbox").text(id.toString() + text);
    }
}

=== Object-oriented programming ===
While classes in JavaScript (ECMAScript 6) are syntactic sugar for prototypes under the hood, JS++ classes resemble the classes found in classical programming languages such as C++, Java, and C# in terms of memory layout, performance, and semantics. "Classes" are a static concept, and they cannot be altered at runtime (during program execution) as is the case for JavaScript, Smalltalk, Lisp, and TypeScript, which rely on prototypes. For example, private methods are private at both compile time and runtime, and external JavaScript objects cannot access private JS++ fields or methods—even if a reference to a JS++ object is obtained from JavaScript.

==== Example: object-oriented sorting ====
The following source code illustrates object-oriented sorting in JS++ using the System.IComparable<T> interface and System.Comparison enumeration for type-safe and readable comparisons. The custom sorting logic is one line of code in the overridden compare() method below:

import System;
 
class Employee : IComparable<Employee> {
    private string firstName;
    private string lastName;
 
    public Employee(string firstName, string lastName) {
        this.firstName = firstName;
        this.lastName = lastName;
    }
 
    public override Comparison compare(Employee that) {
        // Sort by employee surname
        return this.lastName.compare(that.lastName);
    }
 
    public override string toString() {
        return `${this.firstName} ${this.lastName}`;
    }
}

Employee zig = new Employee("Zig", "Ziglar");
Employee john = new Employee("John", "Smith");
Employee abe = new Employee("Abe", "Lincoln");

Employee[] employees = [zig, john, abe];
employees.sort();
Console.log(employees.join(", "));

Abe Lincoln, John Smith, Zig Ziglar

Thus, in the code above, the custom sorting logic provided is:

return this.lastName.compare(that.lastName);

Likewise, to call the sort:

employees.sort();

For printing the sorted results:

Console.log(employees.join(", "));

==== Example: encapsulation by default ====
JS++ provides encapsulation by default. In the following example, the fields x and y are private by default, even if no access modifier is specified. The methods getX() and getY() are public by default. This enables a more concise class definition syntax, as illustrated in the Point class below:

class Point {
    int x;
    int y;
 
    Point(int x, int y) {
        this.x = x;
        this.y = y;
    }
 
    int getX() {
        return this.x; 
    }

    int getY() { 
        return this.y; 
    }
}

=== Out-of-bounds analysis ===
An out-of-bounds access usually occurs with arrays and other containers. For example, when we access the 100th element of a 3-element array, we have an out-of-bounds access:

int[] arr = [1, 2, 3];
Console.log(arr[100]); // out-of-bounds access, 'arr' does not have an element at index 100

In Java and C#, this can result in an exception and program termination. In C, this can result in buffer overflows or segmentation faults. C++ has varying semantics, such as default initialization, exceptions, segmentation faults, or buffer overflows.

JS++ can efficiently analyze and prevent out-of-bounds errors at compile time.

JavaScript has the notion of null and undefined values, where null means a value is present but it is an empty value, and undefined means there isn't a value there at all. JS++ extends this intuition further to differentiate between empty values and out-of-bounds accesses.

Consider the following code, with a nullable int type represented with int?:

int[] a = [1, 2];
int? value1 = a[2];
if (value1 == null) {
    Console.log("Definitely out of bounds");
}
 
int?[] b = [1, null];
int? value2 = b[2];
if (value2 == null) {
    Console.log("Might be out of bounds, might just be an access of a null element");
}

While nullable types can represent an out-of-bounds access, it falls apart when the array might contain nullable values as illustrated above. Instead, JS++ introduces an additional concept in addition to null values: undefined values. Recall that JS++ extends the JavaScript notion that null means a value is present but is an empty value, while an undefined value means a value does not exist at all. JS++ uses the concept of "a value does not exist at all" to mean an out-of-bounds access has occurred, and this concept is known in JS++ as "existent types."

Therefore, the previous example can be amended. The existent type int+ means "int or out of bounds" and int?+ means "int, null, or out of bounds":

int[] a = [1, 2];
int? value1 = a[2];
if (value1 == undefined) {
    Console.log("Definitely out of bounds");
}

int?[] b = [1, null];
int?+ value2 = b[2];
if (value2 == undefined) {
    Console.log("Definitely out of bounds");
}

Intuitively, this means existent types cannot be used as the underlying type for array elements. JS++ enforces this at compile time:

int+[] arr = []; // ERROR

[ ERROR ] JSPPE5204: Existent type `int+' cannot be used as the element type for arrays

Instead of following every conditional branch or virtual method call path, which would result in path explosion and exponential compile times, existent types have essentially the same compile-time analysis cost as int, bool, and other primitive types. Consequently, compile times have been shown to be unaffected (±1-2ms) by the introduction of existent types. Since existent types are used for all array and container types in JS++ (such as hash maps, System.Stack<T>, and System.Queue<T>), JS++ containers are thus guaranteed to not have out-of-bounds errors.

In JS++, undefined is a value that cannot be changed. In JavaScript (ECMAScript 3), undefined is a mutable property of the global object, resulting in circumstances where "undefined" can be "defined." Thus, existent types would not have been possible in pure JavaScript, as arrays can contain elements with the undefined value, undefined can be defined, or other edge and corner cases that are prevented in JS++.

Also, in comparison to Java and early object-oriented languages such as Eiffel, JS++ does not default initialize objects to null. Instead, the compiler enforces initialization by the programmer:

class Car {}

Car car;

[  ERROR  ] JSPPE6000: Variable `car' is not initialized at line 3 char 4

Therefore, since existent types are deeply embedded into the language, JS++ can guarantee that out-of-bounds errors never occur.

==== Databases ====
The concept of existent types can be extended outside of containers. For example, in MySQL, columns can be nullable. If the row does not exist for a specified condition (e.g. WHERE clause), the undefined value can be returned. However, if the row does exist but the value at the column is empty, a null value can be returned instead. This can simplify the code and interfaces to the data access layer.

=== Integer types ===
JS++ provides 8-bit, 16-bit, 32-bit, and 64-bit integer types as well as floating point types:

byte b1 = 0xFF;        // unsigned 8-bit
signed byte b2 = -1;   // signed 8-bit
short s1 = 1;          // signed 16-bit
unsigned short s2 = 1; // unsigned 16-bit
int x1 = 0;            // signed 32-bit
unsigned int x2 = 0;   // unsigned 32-bit
long z1 = 1;           // signed 64-bit
unsigned long z2 = 1;  // unsigned 64-bit

float f = 0.5;         // single-precision floating point
double d = 0.5;        // double-precision floating point

From the project homepage:

// You're not required to declare the type for a variable and you can just
// keep writing regular JavaScript (again, NO learning curve):
var offset = 0;

// But, if you do, this next variable will always remain an 'unsigned int' - even at runtime.
// You'll never see NaN ("Not a Number") runtime errors again.
// This variable is 'unsigned' so it's also guaranteed to never be negative.
unsigned int pageHeight = $(document).height();

=== Block scoping ===
All variables in JS++ are block-scoped, including the JavaScript var statement. Thus, there is no need for two different variable declaration keywords with different scoping rules, such as var and let co-existing simultaneously in JavaScript (ECMAScript 6).

== Development tools ==
=== Compiler ===
The JS++ compiler is available for Windows, macOS, and Linux. It is a source-to-source compiler which emits JavaScript source code as an intermediate representation.

The compiler is developed with C/C++, and the developers claim there are "fewer than 10 open bug reports in the core compiler" after 3.5 years of engineering and 400,000 lines of code.

=== Editor integration ===
JS++ integrates with various code editors including Visual Studio Code, Atom, and Sublime Text.

=== Build tools ===
JS++ can be integrated with third-party build tools like Webpack.

== Release history ==
Version number	Release date	Changes
0.01	8 October 2011	Alpha version, initial release
0.011	10 October 2011	Alpha version
0.012	25 October 2011	Alpha version
0.013	29 January 2012	Alpha version
0.014.1	15 August 2012	Alpha version
0.4.1	31 May 2016	Beta version, array and callback types, character literals, integral suffixes, removed ECMAScript ASI
0.4.2	18 October 2016	Modules, function overloading, dead code elimination, editor integrations
0.4.2.1	24 October 2016	Bug fixes
0.4.2.2	17 November 2016	Source map debugging
0.4.2.4	25 December 2016	Support for Mac OS X, C-style casts, callback and array conversions
0.5.0	13 March 2017	Classes
0.5.1	26 March 2017	'foreach' loops
0.5.2	27 July 2017	BSD License, Interfaces, Abstract Classes, Virtual Methods, Auto-boxing
0.7.0	27 October 2017	All ECMAScript 3 features via Array<T> and Standard Library
0.8.0	15 March 2018	Generic programming, Dictionary<T>, multi-line strings, .js++ file extension
0.8.1	27 March 2018	auto, catch-all clauses, standard library modules for handling time, bug fixes
0.8.4	23 May 2018	New string functions, advanced generics, bug fixes, standard library expansion
0.8.5	2 June 2018	Bug fixes
0.8.10	24 November 2018	Faster compile times, stacks, queues, Unicode, Base64, generic default constraint rules
0.9.0	11 January 2019	Efficient compile time out-of-bounds error analysis
0.9.1	1 July 2019	Bug fixes
0.9.2	18 October 2019	Final (immutable) variables and default to 64-bit for macOS Catalina

== See also ==
- Gradual typing
