= Happy path =

Default path without errors or exceptions

In the context of software or information modeling, a happy path (sometimes called happy flow) is a default scenario featuring no exceptional or error conditions. For example, the happy path for a function validating credit card numbers would be where none of the validation rules raise an error, thus letting execution continue successfully to the end, generating a positive response.

Process steps for a happy path are also used in the context of a use case. In contrast to the happy path, process steps for alternate flow and exception flow may also be documented.

Happy path test is a well-defined test case using known input, which executes without exception and produces an expected output. Happy path testing can show that a system meets its functional requirements but it does not guarantee a graceful handling of error conditions or aid in finding hidden bugs.

Happy day (or sunny day) scenario and golden path are slang synonyms for happy path.

In use case analysis, there is only one happy path, but there may be any number of additional alternate path scenarios which are all valid optional outcomes. If valid alternatives exist, the happy path is then identified as the default or most likely positive alternative. The analysis may also show one or more exception paths. An exception path is taken as the result of a fault condition. Use cases and the resulting interactions are commonly modeled in graphical languages such as the Unified Modeling Language (UML) or SysML.

== Unhappy path ==
There is no agreed name for the opposite of happy paths: they may be known as sad paths, bad paths, or exception paths. The term 'unhappy path' is gaining popularity as it suggests a complete opposite to 'happy path' and retains the same context. Usually there is no extra 'unhappy path', leaving such 'term' meaningless, because the happy path reaches the utter end, but an 'unhappy path' is shorter, ends prematurely, and does not reach the desired end, i.e. not even the last page of a wizard. And in contrast to a single happy path, there are a lot of different ways in which things can go wrong, so there is no single criterion to determine 'the unhappy path'.

== See also ==
- Edge case
- Corner case
- Use case
