= Balancing =

Balancing may refer to:

- Balancing (international relations)
- Balancing and deranking, in grammar the use in subordinate clauses of verb forms identical to those in main clauses
- Balancing (bridge), a term in contract bridge
- Balancing (game design)
- Battery balancing, a technique that improves the available capacity of a battery pack with multiple cells
- "Balancing" (Brooklyn Nine-Nine), an episode of the eighth season of Brooklyn Nine-Nine
- "Balancing", an episode of the television series Teletubbies

== See also ==
- Balance (disambiguation)
- Load balancing (disambiguation)
