= Balance =

Balance may refer to:

== Common meanings ==
- Balance (ability) in biomechanics
- Balance (accounting)
- Balance or weighing scale
- Balance, as in equality (mathematics) or equilibrium

== Arts and entertainment ==
=== Film ===
- Balance (1983 film), a Bulgarian film
- Balance (1989 film), a short animated film
- La Balance, a 1982 French film

=== Television ===
- Balance: Television for Living Well, a Canadian television talk show
- "The Balance" (Roswell), an episode of the television series Roswell
- "The Balance", an episode of the animated series Justice League Unlimited

=== Music ===
==== Performers ====
- Balance (band), a 1980s pop-rock group

==== Albums ====
- Balance (Akrobatik album), 2003
- Balance (Kim-Lian album), 2004
- Balance (Leo Kottke album), 1978
- Balance (Masta Killa album), 2025
- Balance (Joe Morris album), 2014
- Balance (Swollen Members album), 1999
- Balance (Ty Tabor album), 2008
- Balance (Melly Goeslaw album), 2013
- Balance (Van Halen album), 1995
- Balance (Armin van Buuren album), 2019
- Balance, 2011 album by Kae Tempest
- The Balance, a 2019 album by Catfish and the Bottlemen
- Balance (Lucy Spraggan album), 2023 album

==== Songs ====
- "Balance", a song by Axium from The Story Thus Far
- "Balance", a song by Band-Maid from Unleash
- "Balance", a song by Ed Sheeran from - (Deluxe vinyl edition)
- "The Balance", a Moody Blues song on the 1970 album A Question of Balance

=== Other ===
- Balance (game design), the concept and the practice of tuning relationships between a game's component systems
- Balance (installation), a 2013 glazed ceramic installation by Tim Ryan
- Balance (puzzle), a mathematical puzzle
- "Balance", a poem by Patti Smith from the book kodak

== Government and law ==
- BALANCE Act (Benefit Authors without Limiting Advancement or Net Consumer Expectations Act), a proposed US federal legislation
- Balance (apportionment), a criterion for fair allocation of seats among parties or states
- Census balance, a census-designated geography in the United States

== Other uses ==
- Balance (advertisement), a 1989 award-winning television advertisement for the Lexus LS 400
- Balance (metaphysics), a desirable point between two or more opposite forces
- Balance (stereo), the amount of signal from each channel reproduced in a stereo audio recording
- The Balance, a personal finance website owned by Dotdash
- The Balance Rehab Clinic, a rehabilitation center network in Europe
- Balance, an book publishing imprint of Grand Central Publishing

== See also ==
- Balancing (disambiguation)
- Ballance (disambiguation)
- Balanced, a wine tasting descriptor
