= Syzkaller =

Software security testing (fuzzing) framework

Syzkaller is a software fuzzing framework that has been used for fuzzing the Linux kernel. It also supports other kernels.

As of 2021, the Syzkaller dashboard showed hundreds of bugs in the Linux kernel.
