= Ballance =

Ballance may refer to:

- Ballance (video game), a 3D puzzle video game for Microsoft Windows
- Ballance, New Zealand, a farming community in Manawatu-Whanganui region of New Zealand's North Island
- Ballance Peak in Oates Land, Antarctica

== People ==
- Alison Ballance, New Zealand writer, journalist, radio presenter and producer
- Bill Ballance (1918–2004), American radio talk show host
- Charles Alfred Ballance (1856–1936), English surgeon
- Chris Ballance (born 1952), Scottish playwright and politician
- Ellen Ballance (1846–1935), New Zealand suffragist, community worker and wife of John Ballance
- Frank Ballance (1942–2019), American politician
- Gary Ballance (born 1989), Zimbabwean-born English test cricketer
- John Ballance (1839–1893), 14th Premier of New Zealand
- Laura Ballance (born 1968), American bassist in the rock band Superchunk and co-founder of Merge Records
- Marshall Ballance (born 1978), American radio and advertising voice actor
- Nancy Ballance, American politician

== See also ==
- Balance (disambiguation)
