= The Balance Rehab Clinic =

Private mental health and addiction treatment provider

- Type: Private
- Industry: Health care
- Founded: 2018; 8 years ago
- Founder: Abdullah Boulad
- Headquarters: Palma de Mallorca, Spain
- Number of locations: Mallorca, Zurich, London
- Services: Residential mental health and addiction treatment
- Website: thebalance.clinic

The Balance Rehab Clinic, also known as The Balance and styled as THE BALANCE, is a private provider of residential mental health and addiction treatment in Europe. It was founded by Abdullah Boulad in 2018. The organization's current website lists services in Mallorca, Zurich, and London.

Its programs combine individually arranged care with private residential accommodation. Each program is dedicated to one client, with an individual residence and schedule.

== History ==
Boulad introduced the concept in Zurich in 2018 and subsequently established it in Palma de Mallorca.

There are both shared and exclusively occupied residences as of 2025. There is also a yacht-based offering around Mallorca.

== Organization and business model ==
The organization combines treatment with accommodation and hospitality support. There are programs in private villas with therapists, personal chefs, and other support staff. Boulad said that familiar amenities were intended to help clients concentrate on treatment.

The Balance's private residential programs are distinguished from related services within its wider group, including COGNIFUL's shared residential care and VAYEMA's outpatient services.

== Treatment and continuing care ==
The organization provides care for mental health conditions and addiction, including depression, trauma, anxiety, and burnout. There is also psychological and psychiatric care alongside medical and complementary services.

Programs are planned around an individual assessment and may address co-occurring mental health and addiction needs. Treatment takes place in a residence reserved for the client, with a coordinated schedule of individual sessions and practical support.

The Balance's residential program differs from care delivered by independent medical providers, diagnostic services, and hospitals, although there is also coordination with external services when those are needed.

Continuing care forms part of the service. Follow-up also sometimes include online sessions or referral to professionals after a client returned home. The program also plans for the transition from residential treatment and coordinating subsequent support.

== Locations ==
As of November 2026, the company has private residential services in Mallorca, Zurich, and London.
