= Negative testing =

Testing if a system can handle unexpected input

Negative testing is a method of testing an application or system to improve the likelihood that an application works as intended/specified and can handle unexpected input and user behavior. Invalid data is inserted to compare the output against the given input. Negative testing is also known as failure testing or error path testing. When performing negative testing exceptions are expected. This shows that the application is able to handle improper user behavior. Users input values that do not work in the system to test its ability to handle incorrect values or system failure.

== Purpose ==
- The purpose of negative testing is to prevent the application from crashing and it also helps improve the quality of an application by detecting defects.
- Negative testing helps you to improve the testing coverage of the application.
- Negative testing makes the application more stable and reliable.
- Negative testing together with positive testing allows users to test the application with any valid (or invalid) input data.

== Benefits of negative testing ==
Negative testing is done to check that the product deals properly with the circumstance for which it is not programmed. The fundamental aim of this testing is to check how bad data is taken care of by the systems, and appropriate errors are shown to the client when bad data is entered. Both positive and negative testing play an important role. Positive testing ensures that the application does what it is implied for and performs each function as expected. Negative testing is opposite of positive testing. Negative testing discovers diverse approaches to make the application crash and handle the crash effortlessly.

Example

- If there is a text box that can only take numeric values but the user tries to type a letter, the correct behavior would be to display a message such as "(Incorrect data) Please enter a number".
- If the user is to fill the name field and there are ground rules that the name text is mandatory to fill, but that the name box shouldn't have values other than letters (no numeric values and special characters). Negative test cases could be a name containing numeric values or special characters. The correct behavior of the system would be to not display those invalid characters.

== Parameters for writing Negative test cases ==
There are two basic techniques that help to write sufficient test cases to cover most of the functionalities of the system. Both these techniques are used in positive testing as well. The two parameters are:

- Boundary-value analysis

Boundary indicates a limit to something. In this parameter, test scenarios are designed in such a way that it covers the boundary values and validates how the application behaves on these boundary values.

Example If there is an application that accepts Ids ranging from 0–255. Hence in this scenario, 0,255 will form the boundary values. The values within the range of 0–255 will constitute the positive testing. Any inputs going below 0 or above 255 will be considered invalid and will constitute negative testing.

- Equivalence Partitioning

The input data may be divided into many partitions. Values from each partition must be tested at least once. Partitions with valid values are used for positive testing. While partitions with invalid values are used for negative testing.

Example Numeric values from minus ten to ten are divided into two partitions: from minus ten to zero and from one to ten. If we need to test positive numeric values, then the first partition (from minus ten to zero) is used in negative testing.
