= Fuzzing =

Automated software testing technique

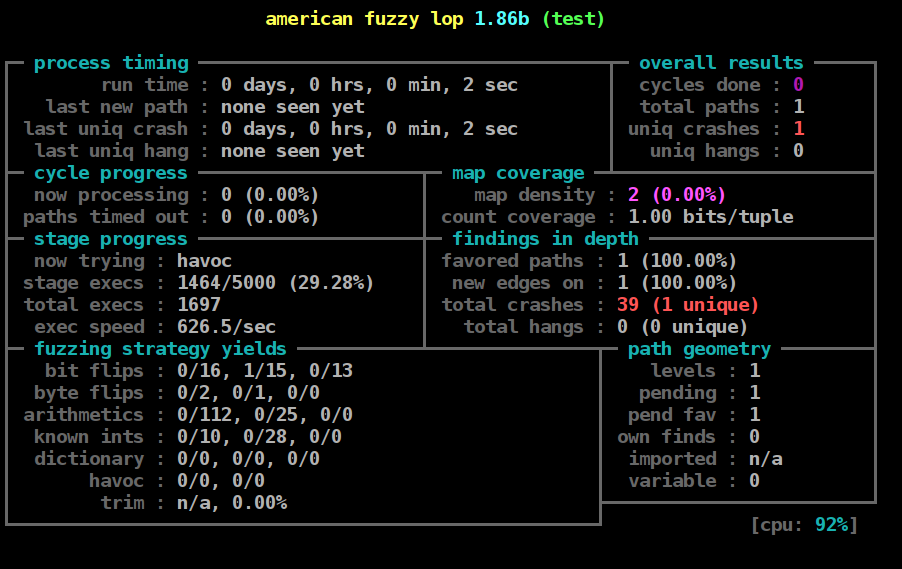
American Fuzzy Lop's afl-fuzz running on a test program

In programming and software development, fuzzing or fuzz testing is an automated software testing technique that involves providing invalid, unexpected, or random data as inputs to a computer program. The program is then monitored for exceptions such as crashes, failing built-in code assertions, or potential memory leaks. Typically, fuzzers are used to test programs that take structured inputs. This structure is specified, such as in a file format or protocol and distinguishes valid from invalid input. An effective fuzzer generates semi-valid inputs that are "valid enough" in that they are not directly rejected by the parser, but do create unexpected behaviors deeper in the program and are "invalid enough" to expose corner cases that have not been properly dealt with.

For the purpose of security, input that crosses a trust boundary is often the most useful. For example, it is more important to fuzz code that handles a file uploaded by any user than it is to fuzz the code that parses a configuration file that is accessible only to a privileged user.

== History ==
The term "fuzz" originates from a 1988 class project in the graduate Advanced Operating Systems class (CS736), taught by Prof. Barton Miller at the University of Wisconsin, whose results were subsequently published in 1990. To fuzz test a UNIX utility, the project automatically generated random input and command-line parameters for the utility. The project was designed to test the reliability of UNIX command line programs by executing a large number of random inputs in quick succession until they crashed. Miller's team was able to crash 25 to 33 percent of the utilities that they tested. They then debugged each of the crashes to determine the cause and categorized each detected failure. To allow other researchers to conduct similar experiments with other software, the source code of the tools, the test procedures, and the raw result data were made publicly available. This early fuzzing would now be called black box, generational, unstructured (dumb or "classic") fuzzing.

According to Prof. Barton Miller, "In the process of writing the project description, I needed to give this kind of testing a name. I wanted a name that would evoke the feeling of random, unstructured data. After trying out several ideas, I settled on the term fuzz."

A key contribution of this early work was a simple (almost simplistic) oracle. A program failed its test if it crashed or hung under the random input and was considered to have passed otherwise. While test oracles can be challenging to construct, the oracle for this early fuzz testing was simple and universal to apply.

In April 2012, Google announced ClusterFuzz, a cloud-based fuzzing infrastructure for security-critical components of the Chromium web browser. Security researchers can upload their own fuzzers and collect bug bounties if ClusterFuzz finds a crash with the uploaded fuzzer.

In September 2014, Shellshock was disclosed as a family of security bugs in the widely used UNIX Bash shell; most vulnerabilities of Shellshock were found using the fuzzer AFL. (Many Internet-facing services, such as some web server deployments, use Bash to process certain requests, allowing an attacker to cause vulnerable versions of Bash to execute arbitrary commands. This can allow an attacker to gain unauthorized access to a computer system.)

In April 2015, Hanno Böck showed how the fuzzer AFL could have found the 2014 Heartbleed vulnerability. (The Heartbleed vulnerability was disclosed in April 2014. It is a serious vulnerability that allows adversaries to decipher otherwise encrypted communication. The vulnerability was accidentally introduced into OpenSSL which implements TLS and is used by the majority of the servers on the internet. Shodan reported 238,000 machines still vulnerable in April 2016; 200,000 in January 2017.)

In August 2016, the Defense Advanced Research Projects Agency (DARPA) held the finals of the first Cyber Grand Challenge, a fully automated capture-the-flag competition that lasted 11 hours. The objective was to develop automatic defense systems that can discover, exploit, and correct software flaws in real-time. Fuzzing was used as an effective offense strategy to discover flaws in the software of the opponents. It showed tremendous potential in the automation of vulnerability detection. The winner was a system called "Mayhem" developed by the team ForAllSecure led by David Brumley.

In September 2016, Microsoft announced Project Springfield, a cloud-based fuzz testing service for finding security critical bugs in software.

In December 2016, Google announced OSS-Fuzz which allows for continuous fuzzing of several security-critical open-source projects.

At Black Hat 2018, Christopher Domas demonstrated the use of fuzzing to expose the existence of a hidden RISC core in a processor. This core was able to bypass existing security checks to execute Ring 0 commands from Ring 3.

In September 2020, Microsoft released OneFuzz, a self-hosted fuzzing-as-a-service platform that automates the detection of software bugs. It supports Windows and Linux. It was archived three years later on November 1, 2023.

== Early random testing ==
Testing programs with random inputs dates back to the 1950s when data was still stored on punched cards. Programmers would use punched cards that were pulled from the trash or card decks of random numbers as input to computer programs. If an execution revealed undesired behavior, a bug had been detected.

The execution of random inputs is also called random testing, monkey testing or Monte Carlo debugging (in analogy to Monte Carlo methods).

In 1981, Duran and Ntafos formally investigated the effectiveness of testing a program with random inputs. While random testing had been widely perceived to be the worst means of testing a program, the authors could show that it is a cost-effective alternative to more systematic testing techniques.

In 1983, Steve Capps at Apple developed "The Monkey", a tool that would generate random inputs for classic Mac OS applications, such as MacPaint. The figurative "monkey" refers to the infinite monkey theorem which states that a monkey hitting keys at random on a typewriter keyboard for an infinite amount of time will eventually type out the entire works of Shakespeare. In the case of testing, the monkey would write the particular sequence of inputs that would trigger a crash.

In 1991, the crashme tool was released, which was intended to test the robustness of Unix and Unix-like operating systems by randomly executing systems calls with randomly chosen parameters.

== Types ==
A fuzzer can be categorized in several ways:

1. A fuzzer can be generation-based or mutation-based depending on whether inputs are generated from scratch or by modifying existing inputs.
2. A fuzzer can be dumb (unstructured) or smart (structured) depending on whether it is aware of input structure.
3. A fuzzer can be white-, grey-, or black-box, depending on whether it is aware of program structure.

=== Reuse of existing input seeds ===
A mutation-based fuzzer leverages an existing corpus of seed inputs during fuzzing. It generates inputs by modifying (or rather mutating) the provided seeds. For example, when fuzzing the image library libpng, the user would provide a set of valid PNG image files as seeds while a mutation-based fuzzer would modify these seeds to produce semi-valid variants of each seed. The corpus of seed files may contain thousands of potentially similar inputs. Automated seed selection (or test suite reduction) allows users to pick the best seeds in order to maximize the total number of bugs found during a fuzz campaign.

A generation-based fuzzer generates inputs from scratch. For instance, a smart generation-based fuzzer takes the input model that was provided by the user to generate new inputs. Unlike mutation-based fuzzers, a generation-based fuzzer does not depend on the existence or quality of a corpus of seed inputs.

Some fuzzers have the capability to do both, to generate inputs from scratch and to generate inputs by mutation of existing seeds.

=== Aware of input structure ===
Typically, fuzzers are used to generate inputs for programs that take structured inputs, such as a file, a sequence of keyboard or mouse events, or a sequence of messages. This structure distinguishes valid input that is accepted and processed by the program from invalid input that is quickly rejected by the program. What constitutes a valid input may be explicitly specified in an input model. Examples of input models are formal grammars, file formats, GUI-models, and network protocols. Even items not normally considered as input can be fuzzed, such as the contents of databases, shared memory, environment variables or the precise interleaving of threads. An effective fuzzer generates semi-valid inputs that are "valid enough" so that they are not directly rejected by the parser and "invalid enough" so that they might stress corner cases and exercise interesting program behaviours.

A smart (model-based, grammar-based, or protocol-based) fuzzer leverages the input model to generate a greater proportion of valid inputs. For instance, if the input can be modelled as an abstract syntax tree, then a smart mutation-based fuzzer would employ random transformations to move complete subtrees from one node to another. If the input can be modelled by a formal grammar, a smart generation-based fuzzer would instantiate the production rules to generate inputs that are valid with respect to the grammar. However, generally the input model must be explicitly provided, which is difficult to do when the model is proprietary, unknown, or very complex. If a large corpus of valid and invalid inputs is available, a grammar induction technique, such as Angluin's L* algorithm, would be able to generate an input model.

A dumb fuzzer does not require the input model and can thus be employed to fuzz a wider variety of programs. For instance, AFL is a dumb mutation-based fuzzer that modifies a seed file by flipping random bits, by substituting random bytes with "interesting" values, and by moving or deleting blocks of data. However, a dumb fuzzer might generate a lower proportion of valid inputs and stress the parser code rather than the main components of a program. The disadvantage of dumb fuzzers can be illustrated by means of the construction of a valid checksum for a cyclic redundancy check (CRC). A CRC is an error-detecting code that ensures that the integrity of the data contained in the input file is preserved during transmission. A checksum is computed over the input data and recorded in the file. When the program processes the received file and the recorded checksum does not match the re-computed checksum, then the file is rejected as invalid. Now, a fuzzer that is unaware of the CRC is unlikely to generate the correct checksum. However, there are attempts to identify and re-compute a potential checksum in the mutated input, once a dumb mutation-based fuzzer has modified the protected data.

=== Aware of program structure ===
Typically, a fuzzer is considered more effective if it achieves a higher degree of code coverage. The rationale is that if a fuzzer does not exercise certain structural elements in the program, then it is also not able to reveal bugs that are hiding in these elements. Some program elements are considered more critical than others. For instance, a division operator might cause a division by zero error, or a system call may crash the program.

A black-box fuzzer treats the program as a black box and is unaware of internal program structure. For instance, a random testing tool that generates inputs at random is considered a blackbox fuzzer. Hence, a blackbox fuzzer can execute several hundred inputs per second, can be easily parallelized, and can scale to programs of arbitrary size. However, blackbox fuzzers may only scratch the surface and expose "shallow" bugs. Hence, there are attempts to develop blackbox fuzzers that can incrementally learn about the internal structure (and behavior) of a program during fuzzing by observing the program's output given an input. For instance, LearnLib employs active learning to generate an automaton that represents the behavior of a web application.

A white-box fuzzer leverages program analysis to systematically increase code coverage or to reach certain critical program locations. For instance, SAGE leverages symbolic execution to systematically explore different paths in the program (a technique known as concolic execution). If the program's specification is available, a whitebox fuzzer might leverage techniques from model-based testing to generate inputs and check the program outputs against the program specification. A whitebox fuzzer can be very effective at exposing bugs that hide deep in the program. However, the time used for analysis (of the program or its specification) can become prohibitive. If the whitebox fuzzer takes relatively too long to generate an input, a blackbox fuzzer will be more efficient. Hence, there are attempts to combine the efficiency of blackbox fuzzers and the effectiveness of whitebox fuzzers.

A gray-box fuzzer leverages instrumentation rather than program analysis to glean information about the program. For instance, AFL and libFuzzer utilize lightweight instrumentation to trace basic block transitions exercised by an input. This leads to a reasonable performance overhead but informs the fuzzer about the increase in code coverage during fuzzing, which makes gray-box fuzzers extremely efficient vulnerability detection tools.

A common form of gray-box fuzzing is coverage-guided fuzzing, where the fuzzer uses coverage information from previous executions to guide the generation of new inputs. Inputs that result in previously unseen behavior can then be retained in the corpus, and mutated further in an attempt to discover additional execution paths.

== Uses ==
Fuzzing is used mostly as an automated technique to expose vulnerabilities in security-critical programs that might be exploited with malicious intent. More generally, fuzzing is used to demonstrate the presence of bugs rather than their absence. Running a fuzzing campaign for several weeks without finding a bug does not prove the program correct. After all, the program may still fail for an input that has not yet been executed; executing a program for all inputs is prohibitively expensive. If the objective is to prove a program correct for all inputs, a formal specification must exist and techniques from formal methods must be used.

=== Exposing bugs ===
In order to expose bugs, a fuzzer must be able to distinguish expected (normal) from unexpected (buggy) program behavior. However, a machine cannot always distinguish a bug from a feature. In automated software testing, this is also called the test oracle problem.

Typically, a fuzzer distinguishes between crashing and non-crashing inputs in the absence of specifications, providing a simple and objective measure. Crashes can be easily identified and might indicate potential vulnerabilities (e.g., denial of service or arbitrary code execution). However, the absence of a crash does not indicate the absence of a vulnerability. For instance, a program written in C may or may not crash when an input causes a buffer overflow. Rather the program's behavior is undefined.

To make a fuzzer more sensitive to failures other than crashes, sanitizers can be used to inject assertions that crash the program when a failure is detected. There are different sanitizers for different kinds of bugs:

- to detect memory related errors, such as buffer overflows and use-after-free (using memory debuggers such as AddressSanitizer),
- to detect race conditions and deadlocks (ThreadSanitizer),
- to detect undefined behavior (UndefinedBehaviorSanitizer),
- to detect memory leaks (LeakSanitizer), or
- to check control-flow integrity (CFISanitizer).

Fuzzing can also be used to detect "differential" bugs if a reference implementation is available. For automated regression testing, the generated inputs are executed on two versions of the same program. For automated differential testing, the generated inputs are executed on two implementations of the same program (e.g., lighttpd and httpd are both implementations of a web server). If the two variants produce different output for the same input, then one may be buggy and should be examined more closely.

=== Validating static analysis reports ===
Static program analysis analyzes a program without actually executing it. This might lead to false positives where the tool reports problems with the program that do not actually exist. Fuzzing in combination with dynamic program analysis can be used to try to generate an input that actually witnesses the reported problem.

=== Browser security ===
Modern web browsers undergo extensive fuzzing. The Chromium code of Google Chrome is continuously fuzzed by the Chrome Security Team with 15,000 cores. For Microsoft Edge [Legacy] and Internet Explorer, Microsoft performed fuzzed testing with 670 machine-years during product development, generating more than 400 billion DOM manipulations from 1 billion HTML files.

== How fuzzing works ==
The exact workflow varies depending on the fuzzing technique and implementation. However, a general fuzzing workflow consists of the following steps:

1. Preparation of inputs
  - Choose a fuzzer.
  - Choose software or a library as the fuzz target.
  - Prepare a seed corpus from existing test inputs or hand-craft inputs for the fuzzer to mutate. Seeds give the fuzzer starting inputs that can be modified into new test cases.
  - Optionally prepare a dictionary, a file that specifies interesting tokens or keywords for a fuzz target.
2. Input generation and mutation
  - The fuzzer will create new test cases from the seeds.
3. Execution
  - The fuzz target will be run with each generated input.
  - Sanitizers such as AddressSanitizer and UndefinedBehaviorSanitizer are also often used when building or configuring the target to detect certain classes of programming errors during execution.
4. Feedback and coverage
  - Feedback-guided fuzzers use feedback, such as code coverage, to guide the generation of future inputs. However, this depends on the fuzzer; not all fuzzers use coverage feedback.
  - Interesting inputs, such as those that reach previously unexplored behavior, can be retained for further mutation.
5. Iteration
  - The process is repeated to explore more program behavior and potentially find bugs.

== Toolchain ==
A fuzzer produces a large number of inputs in a relatively short time. For instance, in 2016 the Google OSS-fuzz project produced around 4 trillion inputs a week. Hence, many fuzzers provide a toolchain that automates otherwise manual and tedious tasks which follow the automated generation of failure-inducing inputs.

Fuzzing can also be built into a continuous fuzzing workflow, in which fuzzing targets are repeatedly built and executed as the software changes. Services such as OSS-Fuzz maintain large scale fuzzing, and can automatically report newly discovered bugs to project maintainers as they push updates and later verify when fixes have been made.

=== Automated bug triage ===
Automated bug triage is used to group a large number of failure-inducing inputs by root cause and to prioritize each individual bug by severity. A fuzzer produces a large number of inputs, and many of the failure-inducing ones may effectively expose the same software bug. Only some of these bugs are security-critical and should be patched with higher priority. For instance the CERT Coordination Center provides the Linux triage tools which group crashing inputs by the produced stack trace and lists each group according to their probability to be exploitable. The Microsoft Security Research Centre (MSEC) developed the "!exploitable" tool which first creates a hash for a crashing input to determine its uniqueness and then assigns an exploitability rating:

- Exploitable
- Probably Exploitable
- Probably Not Exploitable, or
- Unknown.

Previously unreported, triaged bugs might be automatically reported to a bug tracking system. For instance, OSS-Fuzz runs large-scale, long-running fuzzing campaigns for several security-critical software projects where each previously unreported, distinct bug is reported directly to a bug tracker. The OSS-Fuzz bug tracker automatically informs the maintainer of the vulnerable software and checks in regular intervals whether the bug has been fixed in the most recent revision using the uploaded minimized failure-inducing input.

=== Automated input minimization ===
Automated input minimization (or test case reduction) is an automated debugging technique to isolate that part of the failure-inducing input that is actually inducing the failure. If the failure-inducing input is large and mostly malformed, it might be difficult for a developer to understand what exactly is causing the bug. Given the failure-inducing input, an automated minimization tool would remove as many input bytes as possible while still reproducing the original bug. For instance, Delta Debugging is an automated input minimization technique that employs an extended binary search algorithm to find such a minimal input.

== List of popular fuzzers ==
The following is a list of fuzzers described as "popular", "widely used", or similar in the academic literature.

Name	White/gray/black-box	Smart/dumb	Description	Written in	License
AFL	Gray	Dumb	A security-oriented fuzzer that requires essentially no configuration.	C	Apache 2.0
AFL++	Gray	Dumb	A fuzzer that incorporates features developed for AFL, includes: a fuzzer with many mutators and configurations, different source code instrumentation modules, different binary code instrumentation modules, utilities for testcase/corpus minimization, and helper libraries.	C	Apache 2.0
AFLFast	Gray	Dumb	An extension of AFL, uses power schedules to exercise low-frequency program paths significantly faster.	C	Apache 2.0
Angora	Gray	Dumb	A mutation-based coverage guided fuzzer, which mutates a set of seeds to increase program coverage. Combined with efficient and precise input generation which significantly increases input coverage.	C++	Apache 2.0
honggfuzz	Gray	Dumb	A general-purpose fuzzer that uses code coverage (software and hardware-based) to find bugs. It is multi-process, multi-threaded, and supports persistent fuzzing for extreme speed.	C	Apache 2.0
QSYM	Gray / White (Hybrid)	Smart	A fast concolic execution engine designed specifically for hybrid fuzzing.	C++	BSD
SymCC	White	Smart	An LLVM-based C and C++ compiler that builds concolic execution right into the binary. Can be used as a drop-in replacement for clang and clang++.	C++	GPL, LGPL
T-Fuzz	Gray	Smart	An academic binary analysis and fuzzing tool that leverages a coverage guided fuzzer to generate inputs.	Python	MIT
VUzzer	Gray	Smart	An application-aware evolutionary fuzzer that does not require any prior knowledge of the application or input format.	Python / C++	Apache 2.0
Syzkaller	Gray	Smart	An unsupervised coverage-guided kernel fuzzer.	Go	Apache 2.0
LibFuzzer	White	Dumb	An in-process, coverage-guided, evolutionary fuzzing engine.	C++	Apache 2.0

== Limitations ==
Although fuzzing is an effective software testing technique, standard fuzzing techniques face certain limitations.

Fuzzing can generate many unnecessary test cases for complex software, and test cases produced by general fuzzing tools may not always be high-quality. Researchers have adopted deep learning techniques to help address these challenges and increase code coverage. However, further research and development are still needed to improve the effectiveness of these approaches.

Fuzzing tools can also struggle with cyber-physical systems, machine learning systems, and systems whose behavior is determined by their training data. In addition, fuzzers may struggle to detect security-critical flaws that do not cause a crash, such as side-channel leaks involving timing, cache behavior, or energy consumption, as well as privilege escalation and logic errors.

Some bugs are also guarded by complex conditions, making them hard for fuzzers to discover. In such cases, human intervention may be necessary to help the fuzzer make progress.

== See also ==
- American fuzzy lop (fuzzer)
- Concolic testing
- Glitch
- Monkey testing
- Random testing
- Coordinated vulnerability disclosure
- Runtime error detection
- Security testing
- Smoke testing (software)
- Symbolic execution
- System testing
- Test automation
