= Load balancing =

Load balancing or load distribution may refer to:

- Load balancing (computing), balancing a workload among multiple computer devices
- Load balancing (electrical power), the storing of excess electrical power by power stations during low demand periods, for release as demand rises
- Network load balancing, balancing network traffic across multiple links
- Weight distribution, the apportioning of weight within a vehicle, especially cars, airplanes, and watercraft
- Production leveling, a prerequisite to allow 'flow' in the factory
- Resource leveling, a group of techniques for distribution of a workload between workers.
