= Linux on embedded systems =

Uses in embedded systems

The Linux operating system is prevalent in embedded systems. As of 2024, developer surveys and industry reports find that Embedded Linux is used in 44%-46% of embedded systems. Due to its versatility, its large community of developers, as well as its adaptability to devices with size and power constraints, Linux is a popular choice for devices used in edge computing and autonomous systems.

== History ==
additional source for this section

=== Early days ===
Prior to becoming the de-facto standard for microprocessor-based devices, a Linux distribution was created for the Linux Router Project, with the intent of transforming PCs to routers.

=== Introduction of μClinux ===
Starting in the late 1990s and the first decade of the 21st century, the introduction of μClinux enabled ports to a large variety of microprocessors, especially those without a memory management unit (NOMMU). Linux is also used as an alternative to using a proprietary operating system and its associated toolchain.

=== Introduction of BusyBox ===
The introduction of BusyBox in 1999 enabled packaging of critical tools in an embedded system, with a minimal footprint.

=== The ARM-Linux synergy ===
ARM processors are prevalent in many embedded devices, due to their low costs, low power consumption, and low heat generation. The open source nature, the flexibility, and the stability of Linux contribute to its widespread adoption on ARM devices.

=== Development toolchains ===
The development of the GNU cross-compiler facilitated the adoption of Linux embedded to many processors.

=== Android ===
In 2008, Android 1.0 was released, based on the Linux kernel. Android, a Linux-kernel-based operating system acquired and extended by Google, has become the most common platform for smartphones and tablets. In time, Android would become the most successful Linux embedded distribution.

=== Real-time support ===
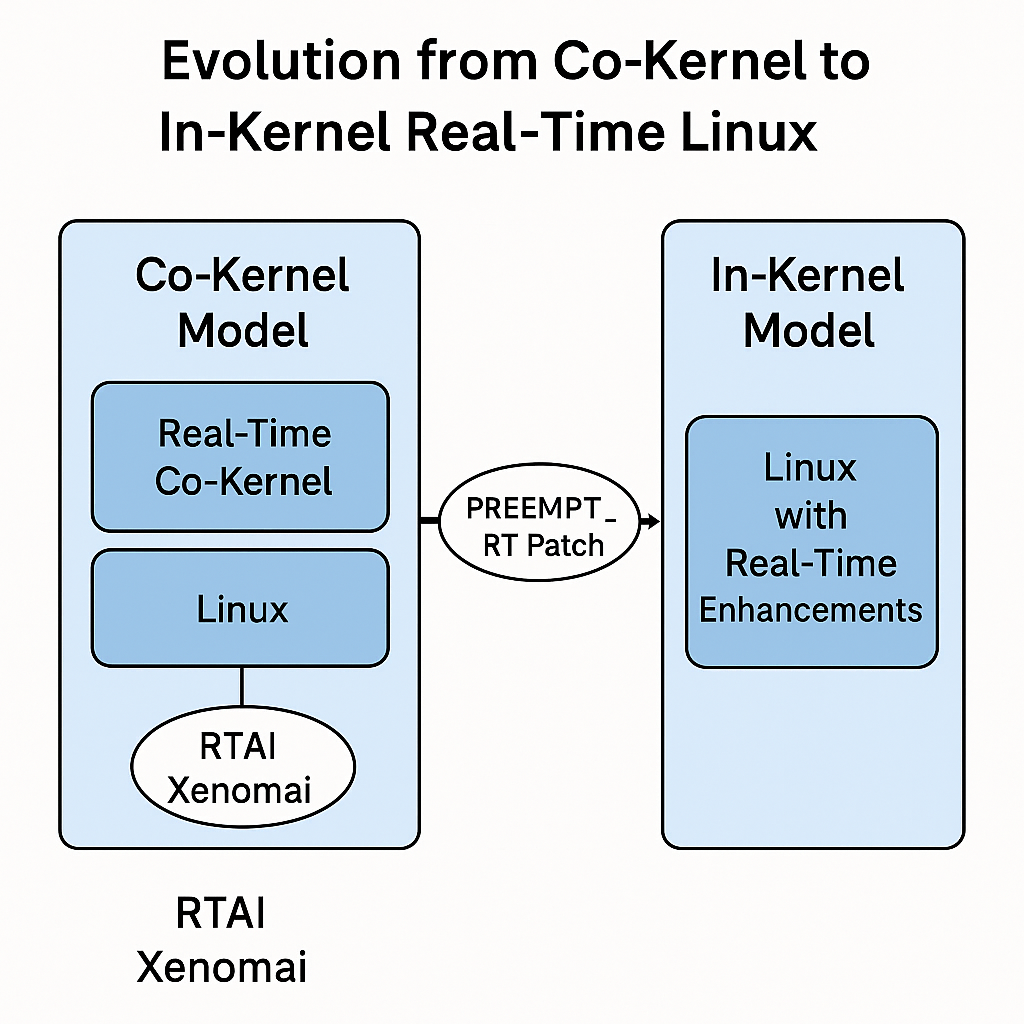
Linux embedded Real Time Evolution

Not every embedded Linux distribution is required to or meets real-time requirements. This is particularly relevant for safety critical applications and systems.

The original Linux kernel was not suitable for real-time tasks due to its non-deterministic behavior

Early attempts to provide real-time support, such as RTAI were based on a real-time kernel alongside the standard kernel.

In 2005, the PREEMPT_RT project was initiated to provide a patch to the Linux kernel.

In 2024, the PREEMPT_RT patch was fully merged into the Linux kernel for supported architectures.

=== IoT ===
The open source nature and security features of Linux have contributed to its prevalence in devices on the edge and IoT systems. Correspondingly, the demand for the real-time capabilities described in the previous subsection, is driven by the proliferation of IoT devices.

=== Containerization ===
The emerging technologies of the fourth industrial revolution have driven further enhancements to the Linux kernel, notably the adoption of containerization.

== Devices coverage ==
Due to its freely available source code and ease of customization, Linux has been shipped in many consumer devices. Starlink and SpaceX use embedded Linux on their constellations and rockets. The Embeddable Linux Kernel is a lightweight and customizable Linux distribution appropriate for low resource hardware. Like the synergy with the ARM architecture as mentioned in #The ARM-Linux Synergy, Linux embedded has evolved with hardware technologies like system on a chip and Single-board computer, networking standards, and memory devices. (example: Raspberry Pi)

== Linux embedded ecosystems ==
With the availability of consumer embedded devices, communities of users and developers were formed around these devices: replacement or enhancements of the Linux distribution shipped on the device have often been made possible thanks to the availability of the source code and to the communities surrounding the devices.

=== Build systems ===
Alongside the evolution of the Linux kernel, build systems evolved to support the building of an optimized operating system for an embedded device.

Before the emergence of these build systems, developers manually built toolchains and compiled each component of the embedded distribution (kernel, libraries, applications).

Currently, there are several solutions, some full build systems, others are supporting tools.

- Yocto Project
- Buildroot
- BitBake
- CMake
- OpenWrt
- Open Embedded

=== Development tools ===
- GNU Compiler Collection - cross compiler
- GDB
- QEMU
- Eclipse IDE

== Variants ==
=== Summary table of variants (2025) ===
Category of Variant	Examples
Networking Devices	OpenWRT, firmware variant DD-WRT
IoT Devices	Ubuntu Core, Balena OS, Raspberry Pi OS
Automotive	Automotive Grade Linux
Safety Critical Applications	Windriver Linux (commercial product), Enabling Linux in Safety Applications (ELISA), MontaVista Linux CGX
High reliability Industrial Applications	Torizon, Xenomai

== See also ==
- Articles:
  - Convergent Linux Platform
  - Linux range of use
  - Linux for mobile devices
  - TinyLinux
- Products/Distributions:
  - Armbian - specialised for ARM single board computers
  - BusyBox
  - BuildRoot
  - Debian – used on Raspberry Pi
  - Embeddable Linux Kernel Subset
  - Emdebian Grip
  - Familiar Linux
  - Google's Android well-known type of embedded Linux, e.g. on smartphones
  - Mobilinux
  - OpenMoko
  - OpenWrt
  - DD-WRT
  - RTLinux
  - Tizen – embedded Linux for smartphones
  - Ubuntu - Core and Server, on Raspberry Pi, x86, ARM
  - μClinux
- Vendors:
  - Access Co.
  - Canonical with Ubuntu Core and Ubuntu Server
  - LynuxWorks
  - Mentor Graphics
  - MontaVista Software
  - Wind River Systems
  - TimeSys
  - ENEA AB
  - SUSE
- Other:
  - Preemption (computing)
  - Safety-critical system
