= MontaVista =

Software company

MontaVista Software
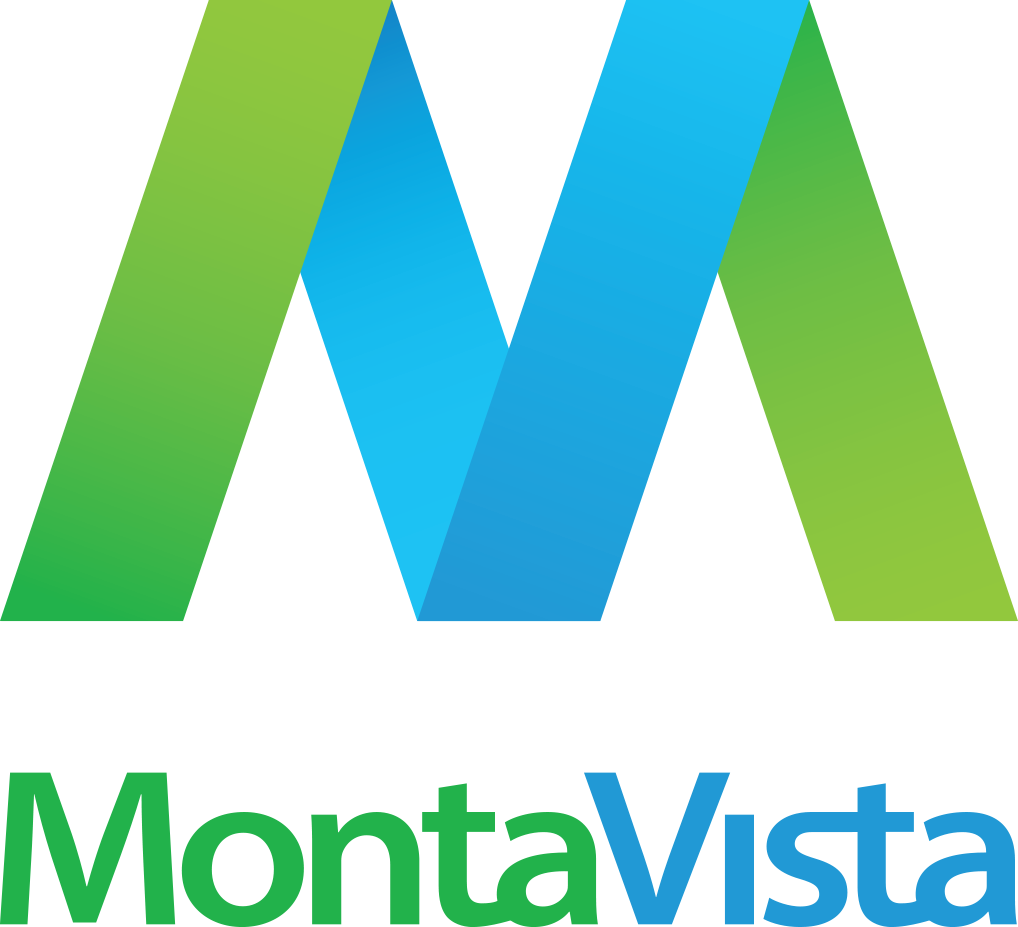
- Industry: Internet, Software
- Founded: Menlo Park, California (September 7, 1998; 28 years ago)
- Founder: Jim Ready
- Headquarters: San Jose, California, United States
- Key people: Ravi Gupta (CEO)
- Products: MontaVista Linux MontaVista DevRocket CGX MVShield
- Owner: Private equity investors
- Number of employees: Over 250 (March 9, 2021)
- Website: www.mvista.com

MontaVista Software, Inc. is a company that develops embedded Linux system software, development tools, and related software. Its products are made for other corporations developing embedded systems such as automotive electronics, communications equipment, mobile phones, and other electronic devices and infrastructure.

MontaVista is based in Santa Clara, California and was founded in 1999 by James "Jim" Ready (formerly at Mentor Graphics and creator of Versatile Real-Time Executive (VRTX) and others. On November 10, 2009 Cavium Networks announced that it had signed a definitive agreement to purchase MontaVista for $50 million. After Cavium got acquired by Marvell, Montavista operated as an independent entity.

== Products ==
=== MontaVista Linux ===
May 12, 2009, MontaVista announced MontaVista Linux 6 (MVL6) comprising Market Specific Distributions, MontaVista Integration Platform, Software Development Kit, MontaVista Zone Content Server, and support and services. There are several differences between MVL6 and prior MontaVista Linux products. The main ones are:

- Market Specific Distributions (MSD) – Linux operating systems (kernel + userland) optimized for each specific semiconductor vendor's hardware.
- MontaVista Integration Platform – based on BitBake, analogous to make, which analyzes a set of directives and then builds a task dependency tree to satisfy a user command. BitBake then executes the defined tasks to completion.
- MontaVista Zone Content Server – accessed from behind a proxy server, or local web mirror for offline operations, to fetch software and updates. Rather than depending on a mix of public HTTP, Concurrent Versions System (CVS), Git, and Subversion servers across the Internet, there is one source for each original source archive and patch.

MontaVista Linux (formerly named Hard Hat Linux) is a Linux distribution that has been enhanced to become a full real-time operating system. The work on real-time performance has since continued to a point where MontaVista claims to support hard real-time tasks on embedded Linux as of MontaVista Linux 4.0, with response times as fast as other real-time operating systems.

MontaVista sells subscriptions, which consist of software, documentation, and technical support. The software includes a Linux kernel and toolchain aimed at a specific hardware configuration, collectively called a Linux Support Package (LSP), and other integrated tools including the Eclipse-based DevRocket integrated development environment (IDE). The distribution is available in three editions, each aimed at different market segments: Professional Edition, Carrier Grade Edition, and Mobilinux. The MontaVista Linux toolkit includes specific code libraries to easily migrate from Wind River Systems' VxWorks and the pSOS operating systems.

=== Carrier Grade eXpress (CGX) ===
Carrier Grade eXpress (CGX) is an operating system equipped with Carrier Grade Linux (CGL) specifications.

MontaVista Linux CGX 5.0, the 15th generation of MontaVista's Carrier Grade Linux, is based on the Yocto Project 5.0 and the Linux kernel 6.6 LTS. It supports major CPU architectures, including x86, ARM, PPC, MIPS, and RISC-V.

MontaVista VPN Client v2.0 received Common Criteria certification in 2026, with CGX Linux forming part of its evaluated operating environment.

=== OpenCGX ===
Project OpenCGX is an open and free to use embedded Linux distribution from MontaVista Software LLC. OpenCGX is based on MontaVista's eleventh generation Carrier Grade Linux. Engineers can quickly jumpstart their ARM and x86 development with a full embedded Linux distribution that is easily customizable. OpenCGX in its introduction is based on Yocto 2.4 with Linux Kernel 4.14 (or latest LTS kernel) and GNU 7.2 toolchain.

=== Carrier Grade Edition (CGE) ===
MontaVista Linux Carrier Grade Edition (CGE) is a commercial-grade Linux development platform for developers working with reliability, availability, and serviceability (RAS) managed hardware (Hardware Platform Interface (HPI), Intelligent Platform Management Interface (IPMI) or custom hardware, who need long-term support and high availability.

MontaVista introduced its first Carrier Grade Edition in 2002 for telecommunications systems. Carrier Grade Edition 3.0 was introduced in 2003, followed by version 3.1, which included PowerPC and AdvancedTCA-related support.

Carrier Grade Linux is governed by the Linux Foundation CGL working group. MontaVista participated in the industry effort that developed Carrier Grade Linux requirements. MontaVista was one of the Linux vendors with a distribution registered as CGL-compliant when the Linux Foundation released CGL 5.0 in 2011.

=== DevRocket ===
MontaVista DevRocket is a set of Eclipse plug-ins for facilitating application and system development with MontaVista Linux. DevRocket integrated development environment (IDE) runs on Linux, Solaris and Windows. It uses the Eclipse C++ Development Toolkit (CDT). Starting with DevRocket 5.0, users can add MontaVista's plug-ins into an existing Eclipse installation, or install Eclipse with the plugins already loaded.

== Services ==
=== System Certification ===
MontaVista Linux is being used in applications within IT and telecom that need to be certified according to Common Criteria, up to EAL4+ level. Evaluation Assurance Level 4+ (EAL4+) is commonly used to secure connectivity in critical environments, such as fire and police departments, or aviation and industry control systems. With the help of EAL4+ these critical environments can, for example, ensure secure and safe phone calls, control communication in-flight and for the assembly line, and achieve secure internet access.

== Legacy products ==
=== Mobilinux ===
MontaVista Mobilinux is for wireless handsets and other mobile devices such as Global Positioning System (GPS) devices, portable medical devices, and wireless POS terminals. Mobilinux's key features include dynamic power management, real-time performance, fast booting, and small memory footprint.

=== Professional Edition ===
MontaVista Professional Edition (Pro) is for general embedded Linux developers. Pro is for intelligent device markets, including networking and communications, instrumentation and control, aerospace and defense, small office/home office (SOHO) devices, and medical devices. Future development of MontaVista Pro has been folded into MontaVista Linux, effectively ending this as a separate edition starting version 5.0.24.

== Open source contributions ==
MontaVista has a history of being a major contributor to the Linux kernel and the open source community. From the start, Jim Ready said he wanted to make it "100% pure Linux" under the GPL. The core changes to make MontaVista Linux into a real-time operating system were made by Nigel Gamble and later updated by Robert Love. Robert Love submitted the changes to the Linux kernel in 2001. The Linux 2.6 stable kernel series is the first to include similar features, such as priority-based preemption. As of 2008, MontaVista had contributed 1.2% of the Linux kernel, making it the 9th-largest corporate contributor to the Linux kernel, according to a survey by the Linux Foundation.

MontaVista has also spun off independent open source projects based on several of its features, including dynamic power management, high resolution POSIX timers, the pramfs file system, and the openais implementation of the Service Availability Forum's (SA Forum) Application Interface Specification.

== Distribution ==
Other versions of MontaVista Linux are used in devices made by a number of partners, including Sony Bravia TVs, NEC routers, and others, especially in Japan. A version of MontaVista Linux OS is used in Dell Latitude E4200 and E4300 notebooks to provide the Latitude ON feature.

Cisco NX-OS is based on HardHat Linux.

=== Mobile phones ===
Motorola became the first company to use Linux on a mobile phone when it released the Motorola A760 to the Chinese market on February 16, 2003. Motorola chose to use MontaVista Linux in the Motorola A760 and future Linux-based phones, despite the fact that Motorola was a founding member of the competing Symbian OS. Since then, Motorola has increased focus on its Linux platform and publicly stated that the future platform for all its mid- and high-tier mobile phones will be Linux with Java, and other phone manufacturers NEC and Panasonic have developed a common platform based on MontaVista Linux.

== See also ==
- Green Hills Software
- LynuxWorks
- Versatile Real-Time Executive (VRTX)
- TimeSys
- Cavium Networks
- Wind River Systems
