= LTIB =

LTIB (GNU/Linux Target Image Builder)
- Developer(s): Stuart Hughes
- Written in: C Perl
- Operating system: Linux
- License: GNU General Public License
- Website: savannah.nongnu.org/projects/ltib

Linux Target Image Builder (LTIB) is an open-source project based on RPM, menuconfig and Perl. LTIB is similar in concept to Buildroot and other Linux file system builders. LTIB can develop and deploy board support packages (BSP) for various target platforms. One can develop a Linux image for their specific target. The project was initially sponsored by Freescale Semiconductor and later moved to Savannah.

== See also ==
- Yocto Project
- Buildroot
- uClinux-dist
- OpenEmbedded
- OpenWRT
