= T2 SDE =

Open source Linux distribution kit

- Developer: René Rebe
- OS family: Linux (Unix-like)
- Working state: Current
- Source model: Open source
- Latest release: 26.6 / June 1, 2026; 4 months ago
- Repository: svn.exactcode.de/t2/trunk/
- Supported platforms: alpha, arm, arm64, ia64, hppa, loongarch64 Microblaze, MIPS64, mipsel, m68k, OpenRISC, RISC-V (32 and 64 bit), ppc64le, ppc64-32, sparc64, x86, and x86-64
- License: GNU General Public License
- Official website: t2linux.com

The T2 SDE (System Development Environment) is an open source Linux distribution kit. It is primarily developed by René Rebe.

== History ==
ROCK Linux was started in the summer of 1996 by Claire Wolf. T2 SDE was forked in 2004, when developers were dissatisfied with the project. ROCK Linux was discontinued in 2010.

In August 2006, version 6.0 was released with ISO images for AMD64, i386, PPC64 and SPARC64. In July 2010, version 8.0 (codenamed "Phoenix") was released. In April 2021, version 21.4 was released. In July 2022, version 22.6 was released. In April 2024, version 24.5 was released. In June 2024, version 24.6 was released shipping Wine for Windows application compatibility as well as LibreOffice and Mozilla Thunderbird for a complete Linux desktop experience. In July 2024, version 24.8 was released shipping OpenJDK for Java compatibility as well as a multi-architectural MIPS64 Linux kernel built for SGI IP27, IP30, IP32 (r5k & r10k) as the first Linux OS release to boot on multiple SGI RISC workstations and servers. In December 2024, version 24.12 was released with initial support for running on Nintendo Wii U, improved SPARC64 and IA-64 stability, an improved global t2 package manager frontend and various other improvements. In April 2025, version 25.4 was released with worlds-first demonstrating AMD's ROCm HPC/AI stack running on RISC-V and ARM64. In October 2025, version 25.10 was released expanding the base package set to a full Wayland desktop for most architectures and significantly improving IA-64 and SPARC64 stability. In June 2026, version 26.6 was released with out-of-the-box Flatpak integration, and expanding KDE Plasma Desktop pre-built binary Live install images to more RISC architectures.

== Usage ==
Puppy Linux has used T2 SDE for compiling their packages. AskoziaPBX has used a fork of T2 SDE because it had support for Blackfin. Archivista made a document management system based on T2 SDE.

== Hardware support ==
T2 SDE supports the x86-64, x86, arm64, arm, RISC-V (32 and 64 bit), ppc64le, ppc64-32, sparc64, MIPS64, mipsel, hppa, m68k, alpha, and ia64 architectures. The PowerPC platform is well supported. There are ISO images available, or users can build it themselves.

T2 SDE is known for its wide, exotic, and vintage hardware support. It has been shown to run on the Nintendo Wii. It also supports the SGI Octane, and the PlayStation 3.

== See also ==
- OpenEmbedded
- Gentoo Linux
- Linux From Scratch
- Yocto Project
