= Multiservice Switch =

Nortel line of routers

Multiservice Switch (MSS) is originally a Nortel line of routers, historically called Passport, designed for carrier core and edge routing. They run the Passport Carrier Release operating system. The MSS has a significant installed base, with over 40,000 switches sold.

As of 27 September 2010, this product line was sold to Ericsson.

The Nortel MSS products have been rebranded to Ericsson PPX.

== Features ==
Some core features of the Multiservice Switch series are:

- MPLS with BGP VPNs
- RFC2764 VPNs
- SONET/ATM, Frame Relay and Ethernet Media Support
- IPv4 Routing (layer 3)
- Layer 3 Traffic Management

== Architecture ==
The Multiservice switches are made up of a shelf of 16 cards. There are two key types of cards to consider:

- the Control Processor or CP is the switch fabric processor: it controls shelf functionality, as well as controls routing as well as manages the provisioning interface;
- the Function Processor or FP is in essence a line card, but there is processing logic and queue logic on the card. This allows for packets to be directly manipulated on the FP, decreasing the load on the CP. FPs normally process data frames on the ingress path and can autonomously forward frames to egress ports without further processing by protocol or control software on the egress FP. This is done by implementing backplane transfer, egress queuing and subsequent transmission all using ASICs.

A shelf can have up to 2 CPs (1 master, 1 hot spare) and 14 FPs (including hot spares).

The MSS has historically gone through two generations of Fabric Control Processors, starting with the i960 initially, and later moving to PowerPC.

MSS software development started in 1990 before MSS hardware was available by applying paravirtualization techniques to VxWorks and running each CP or FP application payload on Sun SPARC workstations, each as a Unix user process.

== Models ==
The Multiservice Switch line is divided into several different models. This division is both historical and technical.

=== MSS 15000/20000 ===
The top-of-the-line switch with a backplane capable of in excess of 50 Gbit/s of data transfer. This is the latest revision to the MSS line.

=== MSS 6400 ===
One of the original Passport switches, the MSS 6400 has a significant historical installed base. Based on a redundant dual 800 Mbit/s backplane. The MSS 6400 had several different configurations available, the three slot 6420, the five slot 6440, and the 16 slot 6480.

=== MSS 7400 ===
Initially running on the same hardware as the MSS 6400, the MSS 7400 uses Passport Carrier Release software only. The MSS 7400 range includes the three-slot 7420 (discontinued), the five-slot 7440, eight-slot 7460, and 16-slot 7480.

=== MSS 9400 ===
The 16-slot MSS 9480 moves away from the dual shared 800 Mbit/s backplanes found in the 6400/7400 series of products. The 9480 backplane is switched, providing a dedicated dual bus to each line card. Most current 7400 line cards work in the 9480 chassis.

== Supported media types ==
There are a number of media types supported by the Multiservice Switch, both modern and historical. For example, Nortel offers line cards that provide Packet over SONET and ATM at OC3 through OC192 speeds (depending on the fabric capacity). As well, Frame Relay and other historical TDM interfaces can be purchased. More recently, Ethernet has become a focus for these switches, and 10/100/1000 media types have been supported (again depending on the fabric capacity).

== Other uses ==
The MSS chassis and architecture is an integral part of Nortel's CDMA and Alcatel-Lucent's (through acquisition) UMTS solutions. These switches run enhanced versions of Nortel's Passport Carrier Release software, but effectively are Multiservice Switches.

== See also ==
- Nortel
- Passport Carrier Release
