= Yocto =

Yocto may refer to:

- Yocto, metric prefix for 10^{−24}
- Yocto Project, Linux Foundation project
