= Linux kernel build system =

Build automation software

The Linux kernel build system is the process by which the Linux kernel is compiled.

== Kconfig ==
Linux kernel build system
- Release: October 30, 2002; 24 years ago
- Included with: Linux kernel, coreboot, Das U-Boot, Zephyr (operating system)
- Predecessor: Configuration Menu Language

Kconfig is an interpreted domain-specific language for specifying software configurability, originally introduced in 2002 as part of version 2.4.45 of the Linux kernel and succeeding Configuration Menu Language. The graphical frontend is provided by the menuconfig tool for user selection of configuration options.

Kconfig is used to specify configuration options available to the user. For example, the following line specifies a boolean option with the frontend prompt "Networking support":

bool "Networking support"

=== Adoption by other software ===
Kconfig has also been adopted by other projects such as the coreboot firmware, the Das U-Boot bootloader, Zephyr, as well as BusyBox.

It is not uncommon for these projects to add their own extensions to the Kconfig language used in the Linux kernel; for example, Zephyr's version of Kconfig adds support for pathname globbing in source statements.

== Kbuild ==
Kbuild is the build system for the Linux kernel.

== Configuration ==
menuconfig
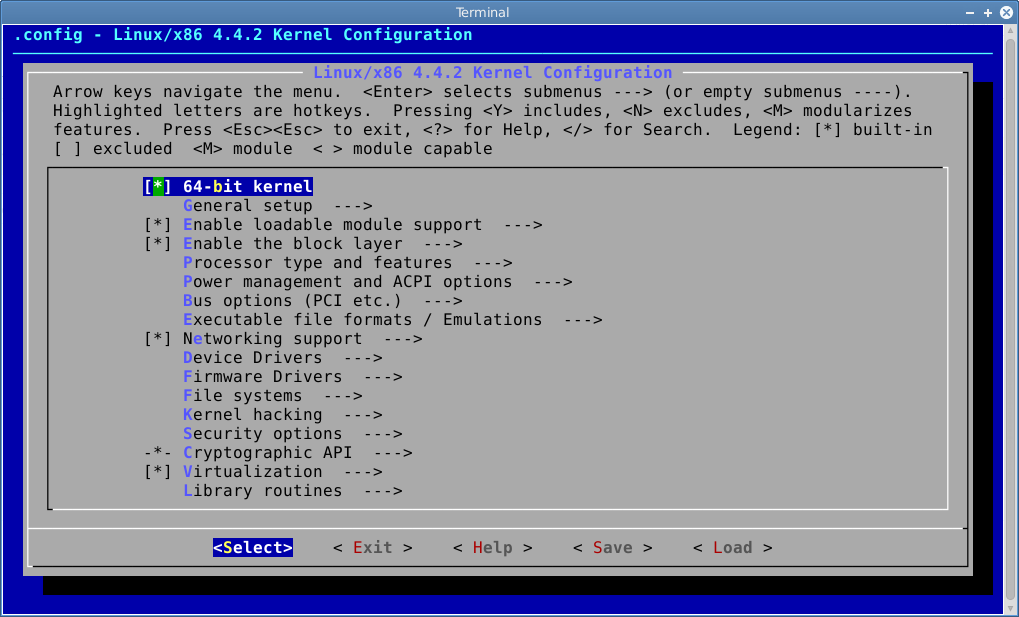
- menuconfig for Linux version 4.4.2
- Written in: C
- Operating system: Linux
- Type: Build automation tool
- License: GNU General Public License
- Website: www.kernel.org

The Linux kernel can be configured using a few similar tools, known collectively as *config (as they are all Makefile targets ending in config). These include config (a plain text question-and-answer utility), menuconfig and nconfig (using text-based GUI), xconfig (using Qt), gconfig (using GTK), and oldconfig (asks only about questions not already answered; used when upgrading from one kernel version to another).

The *config utilities use the Kconfig language internally.
