= Embeddable Linux Kernel Subset =

ELKS
- OS family: Unix-like
- Initial release: 0.0.76 (20 May 1999; 27 years ago)
- Latest release: 0.9.2 / 6 September 2026; 31 days ago
- Repository: github.com/ghaerr/elks
- Available in: English
- Kernel type: Monolithic
- License: GPL v2
- Official website: github.com/ghaerr/elks/wiki

The Embeddable Linux Kernel Subset (ELKS), formerly known as Linux-8086, is a Linux-like operating system kernel. It is a subset of the Linux kernel, intended for 16-bit computers with limited processor and memory resources such as machines powered by Intel 8086 and compatible microprocessors not supported by 32-bit Linux.

== Features and compatibility ==
ELKS is free software and available under the GNU General Public License (GPL). It can work with early 16-bit (e.g. 8086, 8088) and many 32-bit x86 computers like IBM PC compatible systems, and later x86 models in real mode. Another useful area is single board microcomputers, intended as educational tools for "homebrew" projects (hardware hacking), as well as embedded controller systems (e.g. Automation).

Early versions of ELKS also ran on Psion 3a and 3aR SIBO (SIxteen Bit Organiser) PDAs with NEC V30 CPUs, providing another possible field of operation (gadget hardware), if ported to such a platform. This effort was called ELKSibo. Due to lack of interest, SIBO support was removed from version 0.4.0.

Native ELKS programs may run emulated with Elksemu, allowing 8086 code to be used under Linux-i386. An effort to provide ELKS with an Eiffel compliant library also exists.

== History ==
Development of Linux-8086 started in 1995 by Linux kernel developers Alan Cox and Chad Page as a fork of the standard Linux. By early 1996 the project was renamed ELKS (Embeddable Linux Kernel Subset), and in 1997 the first website was created. ELKS version 0.0.63 followed on August 8 that same year. On June 22, 1999, ELKS release 0.0.77 was available, the first version able to run a graphical user interface (the Nano-X Window System). On July 21, ELKS booted on a Psion PDA with SIBO architecture. ELKS 0.0.82 came out on January 10, 2000. By including the SIBO port, it became the first official version running on other computer hardware than the original 8086 base. On March 3 that year, the project was registered on SourceForge.

On January 6, 2001, Cox declared ELKS "basically dead". Nonetheless, release 0.0.84 came along on June 17, 2001, Charilaos (Harry) Kalogirou added TCP/IP networking support seven days later, and in the same year ELKS reached 0.0.90 on November 17. On April 20, 2002, Kalogirou added memory management with disk swapping capability, followed nine days later by ELKS release 0.1.0, considered the first beta version. By end of the year, on December 18, the EDE (Elks Distribution Edition, a distribution based on the ELKS kernel), itself version 0.0.5, is released. January 6, 2003, brought ELKS 0.1.2, an update to 0.1.3 followed on May 3, 2006, the first official release after a long hiatus in development.

A development into FlightLinux, a real-time operating system for spacecraft, was planned, but the project it was intended for (UoSAT-12) eventually settled on the qCF operating system from Quadron Corporation instead.

== Current status and usage ==
Since January 2012 ELKS is again under development. The CVS repository was migrated to Git in February 2012, and numerous patches from the Linux-8086 mailing list were committed to the new repository. Version 0.1.4 came out on February 19, 2012, released by Jody Bruchon in memory of Riley Williams, a former co-developer. It included updated floppy disk images, fixing compilation bugs of the previous version and removing unused codes. On May 10, 2012, BusyELKS was added to the repository by Jody Bruchon in an attempt to replace stand-alone binaries and to take advantage of shared code (ELKS does not support shared libraries). BusyBox-like binaries attempt to save space with symbolic links, eliminating redundant chunks of code, and are combining separate programs into one bigger binary. On November 14, 2013, project development moved to GitHub. Rudimentary Ethernet and FAT support were added in 2017.

More than 35 developers have contributed to this project since the fork in 1995. As of March 2015, development of the ELKS project was again active, reaching a milestone 1,000 source code commits on March 8, 2015. As of June 2018, many bug fixes and improvements were performed with 583 more commits, leading to the 0.2.1 release. In March 2019, the project completed its transition from the obsolete BCC compiler to the more recent GCC-IA16 (GNU Compiler Collection-Intel Architecture 16), and development activity increased as Gregory Haerr took the helm as lead developer. During 2019 and 2020 ELKS moved from a 'bootable, unstable' status to a stable Linux-like system for small machines with Ethernet, TCP/IP, FAT16/32, multiuser serial and many more functions. As ELKS 0.4.0 was released in November 2020, the number of commits had passed 3,000.

Building on the foundation created by 0.4.0, development activity continued during 2021, still with Gregory Haerr as lead developer, supported by 5 active contributors. The team delivered 220 commits from October 2021 to 0.5.0 release on February 8, 2022. Four months later, on Jun 7th 2022, 0.6.0 was released, setting a new level or release frequency and indicating a very high level of activity.

== Version 0.4.0 ==
Version 0.4.0 represented a major milestone for ELKS, lifting the system from experimental to useful for non-developers, and included the following major enhancements:

- Documentation Wiki
- Major kernel enhancements – size, stability, robustness, speed, system calls and debugging features.
- Reliable TCP/IP stack implemented as a user mode process, supporting TCP, ICMP, ARP.
- User level networking support for telnet/telnetd and file transfer.
- Serial IP and Ethernet (NE1K/NE2K/WD8003) support.
- Many new and updated user level commands, including ash and sash shells.
- Many cross development tool-chain enhancements supporting more memory models, easing porting of more applications.
- Robust FAT16/32 and Minix1 file system support, including booting from /root on FAT file systems.
- Improved console and serial support: Serial console, high speed multiple serial I/O.
- MBR support, boot options via /bootopts.
- Updated menu-system for configuration and building on Linux and MacOS, allowing non-developers to build custom images for floppies ranging from 360KB to 2.88MB.

== Version 0.5.0 ==
Version 0.5.0 was another significant milestone for ELKS with a number of important improvements, additions and support for 2 new platforms - the Japanese PC-98 and 80186/80188. Enhancements included:

- Kernel and network debugging tools, toolchain improvements, cleanups to ease porting to new platforms
- Network stack stability and performance improvements
- Native ftp/ftpd programs, expanding network application level protocol support to telnet, ftp, http and raw tcp (netcat)
- Improved runtime configuration via /bootopts configuration file,
- XMS-support for 386 and 286 systems, enabling high memory buffers
- New SSD driver
- Support for compressed executables
- Support for very low memory environments (256k)
- Library and system call enhancements
- Kernel support for variable sector sizes (for PC-98 platform)
- New startup configuration files for networking and mass storage
- Improved networking support when running in QEMU

As of version 0.5.0, ELKS is a complete small-Linux system, usable for testing, diagnosing and running vintage PCs with limited resources. Its improved portability, demonstrated by the addition of new platforms, facilitates increased development activity towards the next version.

== Version 0.6.0 ==
Released on June 7, 2022, 0.6.0 defined a new level for ELKS, as indicated by the much shorter than usual release cycle. The speed at which the system evolves and improves, combined with its recently acquired reliability and usability created a demand for 'updated packaged releases' from new users.

0.6.0 included lots of enhancements and optimizations on both system and application level. New additions included:

- BASIC interpreter with demo programs
- Manual pages
- Expanded support for the new platforms - PC98 and 80186/80188, notably SCSI and IDE drive support for the PC98
- Kernel, library and networking fixes/enhancements
- New commands, such as tar, man and compress

200 commits were delivered by the team between the 0.5.0 and 0.6.0 release, more than half by Gregory Haerr.

== Version 0.7.0 ==
It was released on August 3, 2023.

== See also ==
- TinyLinux
- μClinux
- Fuzix OS, a Linux-like for 8-bit architectures
