= Passport Carrier Release =

Passport Carrier Release (PCR) is a version of the Passport Switch (now Multiservice Switch) software designed to run in telecommunications carrier environments. It was formerly developed by Nortel. After the sale in 2009 of most Nortel's assets, the passport SW is still used in several products of Alcatel-Lucent, Ericsson and Kapsch.

The passport products are now part of Ericsson's PPX products under IP Networking. The Ericsson PPX products can be found at the following link.

== Technologies ==
Internally, PCR is largely built up of custom applications on top of a VxWorks kernel. A benefit of the software is that it is completely modular and can load components to Passport control processors (CPs) and function processors (FPs) on an as-needed basis. FPs (also known as line cards) each run their own instance of the Operating System, and as such can be rebooted without the need to take the entire switch out of service, for example due to a software failure. As well, as would be expected, entire cards can be replaced while the system is hot, thus minimizing downtime due to hardware failure.

== OAM and provisioning ==
PCR consists of a custom OAM interface that is highly object oriented. This reflects the modular nature of the operating system. The core component when provisioning IP networks is the Virtual Router (however, a Passport switch can act in more than IP environments). Interfaces are provisioned as "application" objects, which are then in turn connected to Protocol Ports on a Virtual Router. It is best to consider the environment in which provisioning occurs to be object oriented, in the sense that the behaviour of the router is defined based on which objects are instantiated and how they are related. Note that there is a change in this paradigm noticeable in recent releases of PCR -- MPLS, for example, now resides on an object called simply a Router with built-in IP features. This provisioning approach is more similar to that of Cisco or Juniper Networks.

=== Drawbacks ===
Unfortunately, at this time the OAM interface is unable to select which components are to be loaded on the fly. For example, if Multi-link Point-to-Point Protocol (PPP) is a required feature, before this feature can be used the CP and the FP hosting the MLPPP interface must have the mlppp feature loaded. As well, the vast array of objects available to an operator can be daunting, especially for an individual starting out with Nortel Passport switches for the first time. As well, built in documentation leaves much to be desired (thus not helping the first-time operator), and tab completion features are non-existent (though some objects and parameters have shorthand names, for example the Virtual Router component can simply be known as a Vr).

== Versioning ==
PCR releases are assigned a release code, usually of the form CG##X, where ## is a two digit number and X is a letter, usually referring to a patch code or revision code.

The current release is PCR 10.1.1.

== See also ==
- Nortel
- Multiservice Switch
