= Versatile Real-Time Executive =

Real-time operating system

- Developer: Hunter & Ready; Ready Systems; Microtec Research; Mentor Graphics
- OS family: Real-time operating systems
- Working state: Current
- Initial release: 1981; 45 years ago
- Marketing target: Embedded systems, SoC
- Available in: English
- Supported platforms: Z8002, i8086, i80186, ARM, MIPS, PowerPC, SPARC, RISC, M68K, AMD29K, i960, M88K, i860, i80386, CPU32, StrongARM
- Kernel type: Real-time
- License: Proprietary
- Official website: www.mentor.com

Versatile Real-Time Executive (VRTX) is a real-time operating system (RTOS) developed and marketed by the company Mentor Graphics. VRTX is suitable for both traditional board-based embedded systems and system on a chip (SoC) architectures. It has been superseded by the Nucleus RTOS.

== History ==
The VRTX operating system began as a product of Hunter & Ready, a company founded by James Ready and Colin Hunter in 1980 which later became Ready Systems. This firm later merged with Microtec Research in 1993, and went public in 1994. This firm was then acquired by Mentor Graphics in 1995 and VRTX became a Mentor product.

The VRTX operating system was released in September 1981.

Since the 1980s, the chief rival to VRTX has been VxWorks, a Wind River Systems product. VxWorks had its start in the mid 1980s as compiler and assembly language tools to supplement VRTX, named VRTX works, or VxWorks. Later, Wind River created their own real-time kernel offering similar to VRTX.

== VRTX ==
VRTX comes in several flavors:

- VRTX: 16-bit VRTX, for Z8000, 8086, etc.
- VRTX-32: 32-bit VRTX, for M68K, AMD29K, etc.
- MPV: Multiprocessor VRTX for distributed applications, such as distributed across VME backplanes.
- VRTX-mc: Micro-Controller VRTX, for small systems needing minimal memory use.
- VRTX-oc: On-chip VRTX, freeware community source code for personal and academic use, license required for commercial use.
- VRTX-sa: Scalable Architecture VRTX for full operating system features. Loosely based on Carnegie Mellon University's Mach microkernel principles.
- SPECTRA: Virtual machine (VM) implementation for running a VRTX VM on Unix-like hosts. Also includes an open integrated development environment allowing third-party tools open access to cross-development resources.

Most companies developing software with VRTX use reduced instruction set computer (RISC) microprocessors including ARM, MIPS, PowerPC, or others.

== Implementations ==
VRTX runs the Hubble Space Telescope.

VRTX runs the Wide Area Augmentation System.

VRTX was the first operating system ported to the AMD Am29000.

VRTX is used as a core for the Motorola proprietary P2K operating system, which runs on most company devices since the Motorola V60 and T280i, up to the Motorola RAZR^{2} V9x. It runs on several hardware platforms including LTE (Motorola V300, V500, V600, E398, RAZR V3 and others featuring the ARM7 processor), LTE2 (Motorola L7 and upcoming devices with 176x220 screen resolution), Rainbow POG (3G phones featuring an MCORE processor from Motorola E1000 to RAZR V3x), Argon (all new 3G phones with 532 MHz ARM11 processor since Motorola RAZR MAXX V6, and V3xx), and others.

== See also ==
- Comparison of real-time operating systems
- Xenomai is a real-time development software framework cooperating with the Linux kernel. It could be used to port the VRTX based system to Linux although not all features are supported.
- VRTX has reached end-of-life, an automated porting tool named OS Changer is available to reuse the code on a modern OS.
