= BitBake =

Build automation tool often used for building Linux distributions

- Original author: Holger Schurig
- Developer: OpenEmbedded
- Release: December 7, 2004; 21 years ago
- Stable release: 2.0.1 / May 23, 2022; 4 years ago
- Written in: Python
- Operating system: Linux
- Type: Build automation
- License: GPLv2
- Website: openembedded.org
- Repository: git.openembedded.org/bitbake/

BitBake is a task execution engine build automation tool that allows shell and Python tasks to run in parallel yet in order constrained by configured dependencies. It was originally developed for and is commonly used to build embedded Linux distributions – often using a cross compiler to target a system that differs architecturally from the build host.

BitBake provides capabilities similar to make but via significantly different configuration information. A BitBake recipe specifies how to build a package with information such as where to pull source code from (source URL), dependency constraints, and compile and install options. A source URL commonly specifies a git repo, but other protocols are supported including: http, https, ftp, cvs, svn, and local file system. A recipe also stores metadata for a package in standard variables.

During a build operation, recipes determine build order (constrained by dependencies) and processing tasks to be performed to produce the requested target – recipe or package. A relatively high-level target can produce a complete system software image consisting of boot-time resources, a kernel and a root file system. A build typically includes building the cross-platform build toolchain that generates code for the target platform.

BitBake was inspired by Portage, which is the package management system used by the Gentoo Linux distribution. BitBake existed for some time in the OpenEmbedded project until it was separated out into a standalone, maintained, distribution-independent tool. BitBake is co-maintained by the Yocto Project and the OpenEmbedded project.

== See also ==
- Buildroot – Tool for building Linux
- Openmoko – Discontinued project to create a family of open source mobile phones
- MontaVista – Software company
- List of build automation software
