= Emdebian Grip =

- Developer: Embedded Debian Project
- OS family: Linux (Unix-like)
- Working state: Unsupported/Discontinued
- Source model: Open source
- Initial release: February 14, 2009; 17 years ago
- Latest release: 3.1 / June 15, 2013; 13 years ago
- Update method: APT
- Package manager: dpkg
- Kernel type: Monolithic (Linux kernel)
- License: GPL and other licenses
- Official website: Archived 25 August 2019 at the Wayback Machine

Emdebian Grip is a discontinued small-footprint Linux distribution based on and compatible with Debian. Compared to Debian, it provides more fine-grained control over the package selection, size, dependencies and content, enabling that way the creation of small and efficient Debian packages for use on resource-limited embedded systems. As a result, reduced installation size is one of the main benefits coming from Emdebian Grip.

As of July 13, 2014, the Emdebian Grip project is terminated with no available updates or planned new releases, leaving the version 3.1, which is based on Debian 7.1 ("wheezy"), as the no longer supported latest stable release.

== Overview ==
Emdebian Grip re-packs .deb package files made available by Debian, removing unneeded files such as man pages, info documents, documentation, and unwanted translation files. As such, Emdebian Grip is a Debian distribution builder; the emgrip command (from the emdebian-grip package) processes a .deb package compiled for any of the architectures supported by Debian and generates an equivalent Emdebian Grip package. That way, the binaries, maintainer scripts and dependencies of the original Debian packages are left untouched, but the overall size and the installation footprint of the packages are reduced.

Packages created by Emdebian Grip are not recompiled, so they are completely binary compatible with Debian. As a result, Emdebian Grip maintains as much compatibility as possible with Debian; it is even possible to mix Emdebian and Debian packages, or even to migrate an existing Debian system to Emdebian Grip.

== Releases ==
Emdebian Grip releases
Version	Release date	Base Debian version
1.0 ("lenny")	February 14, 2009	5.0 ("lenny")
1.0.1 ("lenny")	September 6, 2010	5.0.6 ("lenny")
1.0.2 ("lenny")	December 5, 2010	5.0.7 ("lenny")
2.0 ("squeeze")	February 5, 2011	6.0 ("squeeze")
2.0.2 ("squeeze")	September 29, 2011	6.0.2 ("squeeze")
2.0.3 ("squeeze")	October 8, 2011	6.0.3 ("squeeze")
2.0.4 ("squeeze")	January 29, 2012	6.0.4 ("squeeze")
2.0.5 ("squeeze")	May 12, 2012	6.0.5 ("squeeze")
2.0.6 ("squeeze")	September 29, 2012	6.0.6 ("squeeze")
2.0.7 ("squeeze")	February 24, 2013	6.0.7 ("squeeze")
3.0 ("wheezy-grip")	May 4, 2013	7.0 ("wheezy")
3.1 ("wheezy-grip")	June 15, 2013	7.1 ("wheezy")

Emdebian Grip provides complete package repositories for seven architectures: i386, amd64, powerpc, armhf, armel, mips and mipsel. (Note: These are the computer architecture names internally used by Debian.) Included is support for standard Debian tools like debootstrap, multistrap and debian-installer, and there are no functional changes in Emdebian Grip when compared to base Debian releases.

Since version 3.0, all Emdebian Grip suites and codenames include additional "-grip" suffix, compared to their equivalent Debian suites and codenames.

On July 13, 2014, an end-of-life notice posted on the project's web site (Note: "As of July 2014, updates to the Emdebian distributions ceased. There will be no further updates and no further stable releases.") announced that updates to Emdebian Grip are stopped, leaving the version 3.1, which is based on Debian 7.1 ("wheezy"), as the no longer supported latest stable release. The main reasons stated as the cause for ending the project were a lack of embedded devices that do not provide support for expandable storage, and too much work involved with preparing the updates and releasing new versions.

== See also ==
- BitBake – a make-like build tool focusing on cross-compilation for embedded Linux
- Comparison of Linux distributions – compared by the features, support for different architectures, package management, etc.
- ebuild – a specialized bash script for automating compilation and installation of software packages
- List of Linux distributions – categorized by the major base distribution or used package management system
- OpenEmbedded – a software framework for creating embedded Linux distributions
