= Archivista =

Open-source document management software

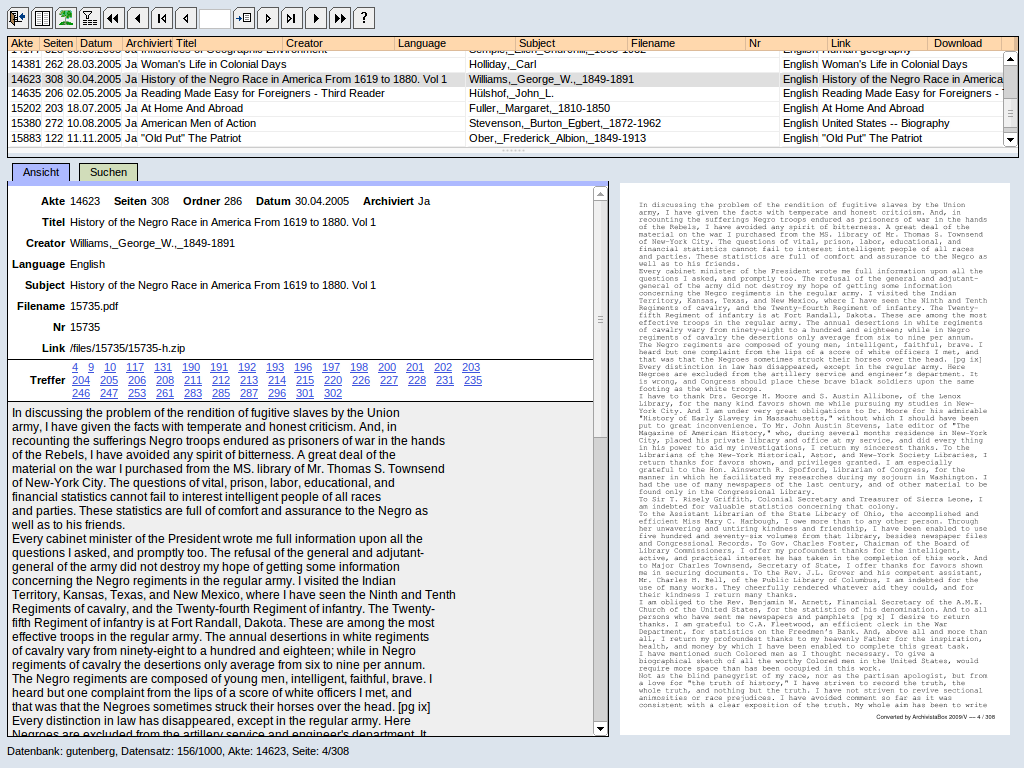
- Archivista version 2010/III browsing archived documents
- Developer: Archivista GmbH
- Stable release: 2025/IV
- Operating system: Linux Live CD
- Type: Document management, open-source
- License: AGPL v3 and proprietary license
- Website: https://archivista.ch/cms/en/home/
- Repository: www.archivista.ch/de/media/archivista-gpl.tgz

Archivista is an open-source document management system based on Devuan Linux. It can be deployed as an embedded system or as a cluster solution, supporting multi-core processing for enhanced performance.

== License ==
ArchivistaBox is released under the AGPL v3. While the commercial version is built upon this foundation, it includes additional proprietary licensed elements.

== Usage ==
The ArchivistaBox is managed via a web-based user interface. The system is designed for operation on standalone workstations as well as within storage clusters. As a turnkey solution, it does not require an external software environment. For document capture, the software supports the integration of document scanners and multi-function printers (MFPs). Through the integrated Common Unix Printing System (CUPS), print data (spool files) are automatically converted into archival formats and stored in the database.

== Building ==
The software published under a Free Software license does not include the build scripts or instructions that would allow rebuilding the live CD.

== Features ==
The ArchivistaBox concept comprises a set of ready-to-use DMS systems which can be put into operation without further ado: all the required features are pre-installed and implementation is kept to an absolute minimum. The advantages:

- Easy installation
- Web-based maintenance
- Modular design
- Scanner integration
- Backup concept
- Compatible with any Archivista solution
- Platform independence
- No laborious filing of individual documents
- Convenient and comfortable searching in entire archives (incl. full text searches)
- Centrally controlled authorisations for users and user groups
- Multi-tenancy archives
- Up to 80 user specific fields
- Automatic OCR
- Barcode and form recognition when scanning documents
- Data upload
- PDF download of every document
- Graphics import from all standard commercial digital cameras
- Internal user administration (with LDAP or HTTP request)
- Optional ArchivistaERP module
