= Mobilinux =

- Developer: MontaVista Software
- OS family: Linux (Unix-like)
- Working state: Discontinued
- Source model: Open source
- Latest release: 5.0 / 5.0.24
- Marketing target: Embedded system
- Supported platforms: ARM architecture
- Kernel type: Monolithic kernel
- Official website: mobilinux.com at the Wayback Machine (archived 2006-02-15)

Mobilinux is a discontinued Linux distribution by MontaVista. It was announced on April 25, 2005.

== History ==
In 2005, PalmSource joined MontaVista to collaborate on Mobilinux.

In April 2005, version 4.0 was released. In 2007, version 5.0 was released.

== Usage ==
Around 35 million devices have run on Mobilinux, mainly in Asian markets. LWN.net argued that because it was controlled by a single company and targeted mobile operators, it did not generate a large developer community. It has been used on smartphones and NAS devices. The Motorola used Mobilinux in their MotoMagx OS, for example Motorola ROKR.

== Hardware support ==
It had support for the Freescale i.MX31 chipset.

== See also ==
- OpenEZX
