= TimeSys =

Timesys Corporation
- Type: Privately held company
- Industry: Embedded Software; Cybersecurity
- Founded: 1995; 31 years ago
- Headquarters: Pittsburgh, Pennsylvania
- Key people: Atul Bansal, CEO
- Products: Vigiles
- Owner: Lynx Software Technologies; (2023–present)
- Number of employees: 60
- Website: www.timesys.com

Timesys Corporation is a company selling Linux open source software security, engineering services, and development tools, for the embedded software market. The firm also helps software development teams build and maintain a custom Linux platform for embedded processors from integrated circuit manufacturers such as Atmel, Freescale, Intel, Texas Instruments, and Xilinx.

On December 12, 2023, Lynx Software Technologies announced that it had completed the purchase of TimeSys Corporation.

== History ==
Based in Pittsburgh, Pennsylvania, it was founded in 1995 by principals associated with Carnegie Mellon University and initially provided the first real-time enhanced embedded Linux distribution, known as Timesys Linux/RT. Timesys joined the OSDL in 2003, and in 2004, was the first to register a carrier-grade Linux distribution.

In 2005, Timesys open-sourced their software. At that time, the firm announced LinuxLink, a software development framework that helps embedded software development teams configure, patch, build and maintain an open source Linux platform. It includes a Linux kernel, GNU toolchain, packages and libraries and development tools. Subscribers are provided with regular updates, documentation and support.

All Linux platform components and updates are open source and are provided through the LinuxLink Factory custom platform builder. Embedded Linux platforms, developed and maintained through LinuxLink, exist in hundreds of consumer electronics, medical device, industrial automation and networking products. LinuxLink evolved to become a portal for customers to gain access to cybersecurity products and services, development tools, and to ask for help.

Timesys added end-to-end device security in 2019. Vigiles is a vulnerability and mitigation tracker for automatically identifying, monitoring and tracking vulnerabilities specific to a developer's actual product configurations, along with triage and mitigation collaboration tools to fix issues. Timesys provides secure by design services, to implementsecurity features including secure boot, over-the-air updates, device encryption, hardening, and security audits. For long-term support of embedded devices, Timesys offers a Linux OS board support package maintenance service.
