= Buildroot =

Tool for building Linux

- Developers: Peter Korsgaard and others
- Initial release: January 12, 2005; 21 years ago
- Stable release: 2026.02 / 4 March 2026
- Written in: Make, shell and C
- Operating system: Linux
- Platform: Embedded Linux
- Size: 6.2 MB
- Type: Build automation
- License: GNU GPL version 2 or later
- Website: buildroot.org
- Repository: gitlab.com/buildroot.org/buildroot/

Buildroot is a set of Makefile and patch files that automates the process of building Linux-based system software for an embedded system, including cross-compiling to a target platform that differs from the build system. Buildroot can build a cross-compilation toolchain, a root file system, a Linux kernel image, and a boot loader.

Buildroot supports multiple computer and instruction set architectures including x86, ARM, MIPS, PowerPC and RISC-V. Buildroot comes with configurations for several off-the-shelf embedded boards, such as Cubieboard, Raspberry Pi and SheevaPlug. Several third-party projects and products use Buildroot as the basis for their build systems, including the OpenWrt project that creates an embedded operating system, and firmware for the customer-premises equipment (CPE) used by the Google Fiber broadband service.

Multiple C standard library variants are supported, including the GNU C Library, uClibc and musl, as well as those belonging to various preconfigured development environments, such as Linaro. Buildroot's build configuration system internally uses Kconfig (which is part of the Linux codebase), to provide features such as a menu-driven interface, handling of dependencies, and contextual help. Buildroot is organized as multiple, automatically downloaded packages, which contain the source code of various userspace applications, system utilities, and libraries. Root file system images, which are the final results, may be built using various file systems, including EROFS, cramfs, JFFS2, romfs, SquashFS and UBIFS.

Buildroot is free and open-source software, maintained by Peter Korsgaard and licensed under version 2 or later of the GNU General Public License (GPL). The project started in 2001, with initial intentions to serve as a testbed for uClibc. New releases are made available every three months.

== See also ==
- BitBake – Build automation tool often used for building Linux distributions
- BusyBox – Collection of Unix commands in a single executable file
- Linux distribution – Operating system based on the Linux kernel
- OpenEmbedded – Build automation framework and cross-compile environment
- OpenWrt – Embedded Linux distribution
- uClibc – Implementation of C standard library for embedded systems based on Linux
- Yocto Project – Organization that develops open-source tools for developing embedded Linux
