= Menuconfig =

Tool for compiling Linux source code

menuconfig
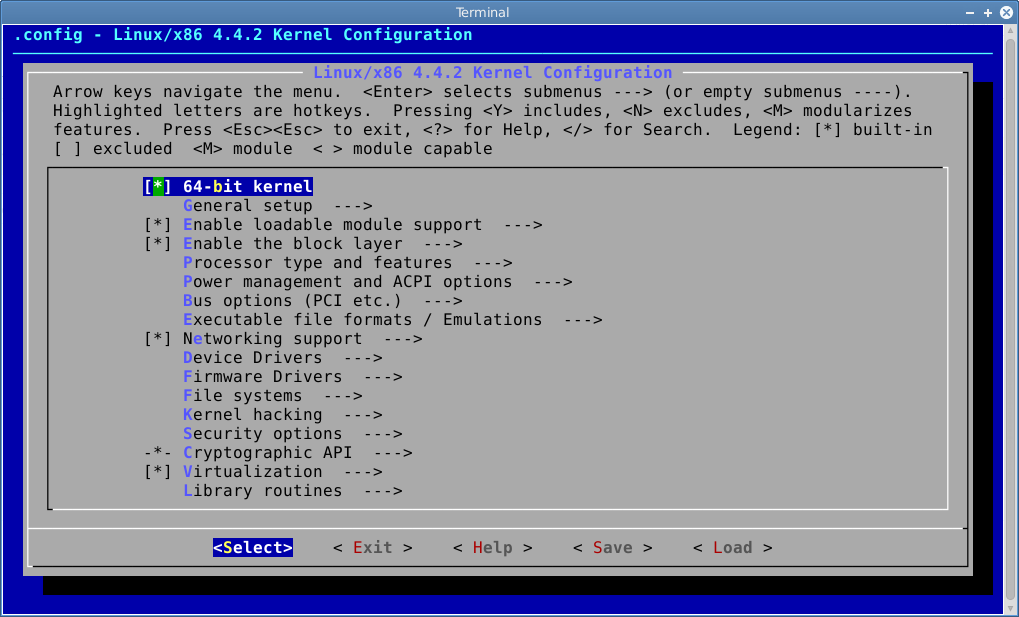
- menuconfig for Linux version 4.4.2
- Written in: C
- Operating system: Linux
- Type: Build automation tool
- License: GNU General Public License
- Website: www.kernel.org

make menuconfig is an ncurses-based TUI for configuring the Linux kernel. It is one of five similar tools that can assist a user in configuring Linux before building, a necessary step needed to compile the source code. make menuconfig, with a menu-driven user interface, allows the user to choose which features and modules to compile. It is normally invoked using the command make menuconfig; menuconfig is a target in the Linux Makefile.

== Overview ==
make menuconfig was not in the first version of Linux. Prior to 2.5.45, the predecessor tool used Configuration Menu Language (CML) and was a question-and-answer-based utility (make config, make oldconfig).

Variations of the tool for Linux configuration include:

- make xconfig, which requires Qt
- make gconfig, which uses GTK+
- make nconfig, which has an updated TUI, compared to make menuconfig.

All these tools use the Kconfig language internally. Kconfig is also used in other projects, such as Das U-Boot, a bootloader for embedded devices, Buildroot, a tool for generating embedded Linux systems, and BusyBox, a single-executable shell utility toolbox for embedded systems.

make menuconfig is generally more user-friendly compared to the question-and-answer-based configuration tool make config, and has a basic search system.

If the user is satisfied with a previous .config file, using make oldconfig uses this previous file to answer all questions that it can, only interactively presenting the new features.

== Dependencies ==
To use make menuconfig, Linux source is a requirement, a make tool, a C compiler, and the ncurses library.

== See also ==
- GNU Compiler Collection
- TUI
