= Wind River Systems =

American software development company

Wind River Systems, Inc.
- Type: Subsidiary
- Founded: 1981; 45 years ago
- Headquarters: Alameda, California, U.S. 37.78116°N 122.26195°W
- Key people: Jay Bellissimo (President)
- Revenue: US $400 million (2021)
- Number of employees: 1,800+ (11/2012)
- Parent: Aptiv
- Website: www.windriver.com

Wind River Systems, Inc., also known as Wind River (trademarked as Wndrvr), is an Alameda, California–based company, subsidiary of Aptiv PLC. The company develops embedded system and cloud software consisting of real-time operating systems software, industry-specific software, simulation technology, development tools and middleware.

== History ==
Wind River Systems was formed by a partnership of Jerry Fiddler and Dave Wilner. Until 1981, Fiddler had worked at Berkeley Lab writing software for control systems, and wanted to pursue a career in computer generated music, which he funded through a consultancy business focused on real-time operating systems. His early clients included the National Football League and film director Francis Ford Coppola, for whom he designed a unique film editing system. Wilner, a former colleague at Berkeley Lab, joined Fiddler to form Wind River Systems in 1983.

In 2009, Wind River was acquired by Intel. In 2018, Intel spun out its Wind River division, which was then acquired by TPG Capital. On January 11, 2022, Wind River announced that it was acquired by Aptiv, an auto parts company, for $4.3 billion in cash.

The company's key milestones include:

- 1983: Wind River is incorporated in 1983 with each partner contributing $3,000 and a desk to the business. The company was named for Wind River, Wyoming, where Fiddler had vacationed that year.
- 1987: Wind River introduces VxWorks, a leading real-time operating system for embedded devices.
- 1995: VxWorks launches into space on the NASA Clementine moon probe. Also, the Tornado integrated development environment is launched and wins EDN's Embedded Development Software Innovation of the Year award as the first graphically oriented development environment for embedded
- 1997: VxWorks, the real-time operating system for NASA's Mars Pathfinder mission, lands on Mars
- 1999: Acquisition of one of its major competitors, Integrated Systems Inc., makers of pSOS. Wind River has since discontinued the pSOS product line and has recommended existing pSOS customers move to VxWorks.
- 2001: Wind River Systems acquired Belgian software company Eonic Systems, the developer of Virtuoso RTOS for DSPs. In November 2015, Wind River Systems renamed the operating system to Rocket, made it open-source and royalty-free. In 2016, Rocket was incorporated into Zephyr RTOS hosted by Linux Foundation.
- 2004: Wind River officially enters the embedded Linux market, with a Carrier Grade Linux platform targeting the networking & communications infrastructure industry. Also, NASA's Mars Exploration Rovers, Spirit and Opportunity, powered by VxWorks, land on Mars. Wind River helped in manufacturing the IntelliStar for The Weather Channel. The IntelliStar is used at Cable Headends to insert Local Weather into The Weather Channel's national programming.
- 2007: Wind River joins Google's Open Handset Alliance as an original Linux commercialization partner.
- 2008: Wind River establishes the embedded Linux market share lead with greater than 30 percent of total market revenue, four years after entering the market.
- 2009: Intel acquires Wind River for approximately $884 million and it becomes a wholly owned subsidiary of Intel. Wind River launches a commercial Android software platform. Wind River becomes a founding member of the GENIVI Alliance, now called COVESA (Connected Vehicle Systems Alliance).
- 2010: Wind River adds Simics, a full system simulator, to its product portfolio. VxWorks becomes the first RTOS to be certified under Wurldtech's Achilles certification program, a standard for industrial cyber security. Wind River partners with Intel and the Linux Foundation to create the Yocto Project, an open source collaboration project providing templates, tools and methods to help developers create embedded Linux-based systems.
- 2012: NASA Jet Propulsion Laboratory (JPL) successfully lands Mars Science Laboratory rover Curiosity, powered by Wind River technology. Wind River debuts software platform targeted at gateways and hubs for the Internet of things.
- 2013: Wind River becomes part of Intel's Internet of Things Group (IOTG), but remains a wholly owned subsidiary. Barry Mainz assumes the position of President.
- 2014: Wind River introduces its software for network functions virtualization (NFV) applications, as well as its next-generation VxWorks platform reinvented for the Internet of Things.
- 2014: Wind River fined $750,000 by Bureau of Industry and Security for exporting encryption technology to countries including Israel and South Korea.
- 2015: the company was accused of repeated trademark and licensing violations of the Grsecurity project, which as response has restricted its code to commercial partners only.
- 2016: Intel announced that it intended to fully integrate Wind River into one of its divisions (thus ending Wind River's status as a wholly owned subsidiary,) although the scheduled completion date of this action has not been made public. Barry Mainz left the company to become president and CEO of MobileIron and Jim Douglas assumes the position of President.
- 2018: Intel divested Wind River Systems to alternative asset fund manager TPG under undisclosed terms.
- 2018: Ford selects Wind River Over-the-Air Update Technology.
- 2018: NASA's InSight lands on Mars with VxWorks operating system.
- 2019: Wind River became the first OpenChain 2.0 conformant organization.
- 2020: Kevin Dallas named as CEO and member of the board of directors.
- 2020: Verizon uses Wind River's software infrastructure for its deployment of virtualized 5G RAN.
- 2020: Wind River becomes first and only to achieve The Open Group FACE Conformance for Linux.
- 2021: Perseverance Mars becomes fourth Mars rover running VxWorks operating system.
- 2021: Vodafone selects Wind River as a partner to build Europe's first commercial open RAN network.
- 2022: Wind River was acquired by Aptiv from TPG Capital for $4.3 billion in cash.
- 2024: Wind River Chief Product Officer Avijit Sinha named as president.

== Products ==
Among the company's products are the VxWorks real-time operating system, the Wind River Linux operating system, and the Eclipse-based Wind River Workbench IDE. VxWorks began as an add-on to the VRTX operating system in the early 1980s. Wind River Workbench superseded the previous Tornado environment.

=== VxWorks ===
VxWorks is the original flagship product of Wind River. It is a real-time operating system (RTOS) intended for embedded and critical infrastructure devices and systems. It supports multicore processors, 32-bit and 64-bit, for several architectures including ARM, Intel, and Power and has over one hundred board support packages (BSPs) for different hardware systems. VxWorks is a real time and deterministic operating system.

=== Wind River Linux ===
Wind River's Linux product is source code and a build system that generate runtime images suitable for embedded devices.

Historically, Wind River Linux has supported a variety of architectures, including ARM, MIPS, PowerPC, IA32 and SPARC.

The current release of Wind River Linux supports a variety of ARM, IA32, and IA64 platforms with both standard and realtime (PREEMPT RT) kernels.

Wind River charges a subscription to provide commercial bug and CVE fixes for its Linux products. Pricing is project-based, with a flat fee for each solution built on top of Wind River Linux. There is no per-device subscription or royalty.

The key capabilities for Wind River Linux are 10 year commercial support life, complete customization including kernel changes, reproducible customizations, wide range of hardware support through Board Support Packages (BSP) that are ported, maintained, and tested by Wind River.

==== Early history ====
In 2004, Wind River announced a partnership with Red Hat to create a new Linux-based distribution for embedded devices. Wind River has since ended its partnership with Red Hat and now ships its own Linux distribution optimized for embedded Linux development.

Wind River released the first version of its embedded Linux distribution, Platform for Network Equipment - Linux Edition (PNE-LE) 1.0 in 2005. It was registered against the Carrier Grade Linux 2.0 specification and supported IA32 and PPC architectures. They added other platforms in subsequent releases, General Purpose Platform - Linux Edition (GPP-LE) and Platform for Consumer Devices - Linux Edition PCD-LE) starting in version 1.4. In 2013 Wind River announced Wind River Linux 6.0.

Wind River Systems acquired FSMLabs embedded technology in February 2007 and made a version available as Wind River Real-Time Core for Wind River Linux. As of August 2011, Wind River has discontinued the Wind River Real-Time Core product line, effectively ending commercial support for the RTLinux product. On August 7, 2007, Palm Inc. announced it would use Wind River Systems Linux for its (later aborted) Palm Foleo.

In 2008, Wind River announced cooperation with BMW, Intel and Magneti Marelli for development of a Linux-based open-source platform to control in-car electronics, which was extended in the GENIVI Alliance in 2009.

==== Yocto Project ====
In 2012, Wind River introduced a version of Linux that was developed from the Yocto Project open source development infrastructure and achieved Yocto project compatible registration. All subsequent releases of Wind River Linux are based on the Yocto Project.

==== Wind River Linux release history ====
Wind River has historically released a new Wind River Linux LTS (Long Term Support) about every year that are generally based on the then current Linux Kernel LTS release and the latest Yocto Project release.

Wind River Linux release	GA	EOL
Wind River Linux LTS 21	Jun 9, 2021	TBA
Wind River Linux LTS 19	Nov 30, 2019	TBA
Wind River Linux LTS 18	Nov 30, 2018	TBA
Wind River Linux LTS 17	Nov 15, 2017	TBA
Wind River Linux 9	Dec 15, 2016	TBA
Wind River Linux 8	Dec 12, 2015	Jan 1, 2026
Wind River Linux 7	Dec 1, 2014	Jan 1, 2025
Wind River Linux 6	Dec 1, 2013	Jan 1, 2024
Wind River Linux 5	Oct 1, 2012	Jan 1, 2023
Wind River Linux 4	Nov 1, 2011	Jan 1, 2022
Wind River Linux 3	Mar 1, 2009	Mar 1,2014
Wind River Linux 2	Sep 1, 2007	Dec 1, 2012
Wind River Linux 1	Apr 1, 2007	Oct 1, 2010

=== Wind River Linux Distro ===
In 2022, Wind River launched a new product, Wind River Linux Distro, that is a binary Linux distribution based on the Wind River Linux source-based product.

The Distro is intended for embedded solution developers that need a commercially supported Linux for their project, but do not need the extensive customization capabilities of the Yocto Project-based Wind River Linux. The key features are quick time to value, customization via tools such as the Linux Assembly Tool & an RPM package feed, and updates via OSTree.

Developers can download a free version of the Wind River Linux Distro by going to https://www.windriver.com/products/linux/download

A number of hardware platforms are enabled by the Distro. Commercial support is currently available for a subset of the enabled platforms.

Wind River Linux Distro	Commercial Support	Free Download
Intel Axxia AXM55xx / AX56xx 32		Y
Intel Axxia AXM55xx / AX56xx 64		Y
Intel Elkhart Lake	Y	Y
Intel Ice Lake	Y	Y
Intel NUC Kaby Lake	Y	Y
Intel Snow Ridge	Y	Y
Intel Stratix 10		Y
Intel Tiger Lake UP3	Y	Y
Marvel Octeon CN96xx (TX2)		Y
NXP i.MX8 QuadMax MEK	Y	Y
NXP LS1028		Y
NXP LS1043A/LS1023A		Y
NXP LX2160		Y
NXP S32G		Y
Raspberry Pi 4	Y	Y
TI DRA820/TDA4xM		Y
Xilinx UltraScale+MPSoC		Y
Xilinx Zynq-7000		Y

=== Simics ===
Simics is a full-system simulator used by software developers to simulate the hardware of complex electronic systems.

=== Wind River Studio ===
Wind River Studio is a cloud-native platform for the deployment and servicing of mission-critical intelligent edge systems.

== Acquisitions ==
- 1991: Assets of ITRA (Vannes, France)
- 1997: DSP Foundry (WiSP RTOS for Motorola DSP563xx family)
- 1999: Integrated Systems Inc. (pSOS+)
- 2000: Merge staff of Dragonfly Software Consulting
- 2000: Embedded Support Tools Corp. (ESTC)
- 2000: ICEsoft (Bergen, Norway)
- 2000: AudeSi Technologies Inc. (Calgary, Alberta, Canada)
- 2001: Eonic Systems (Virtuoso RTOS)
- 2001: Berkeley Software Design Inc. (BSDI)
- 2005: ScopeTools business unit from Real-Time Innovations
- 2006: Interpeak AB (Stockholm, Sweden)
- 2007: Assets of FSMLabs (Socorro, New Mexico, United States)
- 2008: MIZI (Seoul, South Korea)
- 2009: Tilcon Software Limited (Ottawa, Ontario, Canada)
- 2010: Virtutech (Stockholm, Sweden)
- 2011: Switch++ (Santa Clara, United States)
- 2016 Arynga
- 2020 Star Labs
