= Yocto Project =

Organization that develops open-source tools for developing embedded Linux

- Release: 2010; 16 years ago
- Stable release: 5.3 (Whinlatter) / December 2025; 11 months ago
- Written in: Primarily Python, Shell
- Website: yoctoproject.org
- Repository: git.yoctoproject.org

The Yocto Project is a Linux Foundation collaborative open source project whose goal is to produce tools and processes that enable the creation of Linux distributions for embedded and IoT software that are independent of the host hardware architecture, supports customization and results in repeatable output. The toolset managed by the project, commonly called yocto, consists of interoperable tools, metadata, and processes. The project was announced by the Linux Foundation in 2010 and launched in March, 2011, in collaboration with 22 organizations, including OpenEmbedded.

The Yocto and OpenEmbedded projects share maintenance of BitBake (build engine) and OpenEmbedded-Core (core metadata). Yocto provides a reference distro called Poky, which contains the OpenEmbedded build system plus a large set of recipes, arranged in hierarchical layers, that can be used as a template for a customized, embedded operating system.

In addition to building a Linux system, yocto provides other, related features. It can generate a toolchain for cross compilation and a software development kit (SDK) tailored to a hardware environment. It supports package creation in a variety of formats including deb, rpm, or ipk. Within builds, there are options for various build-time sanity/regression tests, and also the option to boot and test certain images under QEMU to validate the build.

The project encourages interaction with upstream projects and has contributed heavily to OpenEmbedded-Core and BitBake as well as to numerous upstream projects, including the Linux kernel. The resulting images are typically useful in systems where embedded Linux would be used, these being single-use focused systems or systems without the usual screens/input devices associated with desktop Linux systems.

There are several other sub-projects under the project umbrella which include CROPS, pseudo, the matchbox suite of applications, and many others. One of the central goals of the project is interoperability among these tools.

In October 2018, Arm Holdings partnered with Intel in order to share code for embedded systems through the Yocto Project.

== Governance ==
The Yocto Project is one of many collaborative projects organized as a non-profit under the banner of the Linux Foundation. The project's governance is divided loosely into technical and administrative arms, although many members participate in both camps.

At a technical level, the project is overseen by the project architect Richard Purdie (a Linux Foundation Fellow) who has a long history of involvement with many of the project's components and technologies. The architect maintains a hierarchy of maintainers for the different components of the system, much as the Linux kernel is maintained.

The administrative arm consists of an advisory board made up of representatives from the project's member organizations, including several major silicon vendors, commercial operating system vendors that use yocto as their upstream, corporate users, as well as representatives from groups such as software consultants and community members. The member organizations of this board provide resources to the project. There are also several advisory board working groups that handle administrative functions for the project such as finance, infrastructure, advocacy and outreach, and community management.

== Branding program ==
The Yocto Project Branding Program provides an opportunity to associate the use of the Yocto Project with an organization or product. An organization that uses yocto is a candidate to be branded as a Yocto Project Participant. A product (such as a BSP or any OE-compatible layer) is a candidate to be branded as Yocto Project Compatible.

== Releases ==
Major releases occur about every 6 months (April and October). Version 3.1 was the first long-term support (LTS) release. Since then, a new LTS release is added every two years. The 3.1 series and 4.0 were originally planned for two years but extended to four. The next LTS releases are planned for 4 years. Since version 3.1, the release codenames are names of mountains or passes in the Cumbria county in Northern England.

The project attempts to update documentation for each release, retaining all documents for current and archived releases on the website, as the documentation can change significantly with any release.

Release	Codename	Date	Support
6.0 (LTS)	Wrynose	04/2026	04/2030
5.3	Whinlatter	12/2025	EOL
5.2	Walnascar	04/2025	EOL
5.1	Styhead	10/2024	EOL
5.0 (LTS)	Scarthgap	04/2024	04/2028
4.3	Nanbield	11/2023	EOL
4.2	Mickledore	05/2023	EOL
4.1	Langdale	10/2022	EOL
4.0 (LTS)	Kirkstone	05/2022	EOL
3.4	Honister	11/2021	EOL
3.3	Hardknott	04/2021	EOL
3.2	Gatesgarth	11/2020	EOL
3.1 (LTS)	Dunfell	04/2020	EOL
3.0	Zeus	10/2019	EOL
2.7	Warrior	04/2019	EOL
2.6	Thud	11/2018	EOL
2.5	Sumo	04/2018	EOL
2.4	Rocko	10/2017	EOL
2.3	Pyro	04/2017	EOL
2.2	Morty	10/2016	EOL
2.1	Krogoth	04/2016	EOL
2.0	Jethro	10/2015	EOL
1.8	Fido	04/2015	EOL
1.7	Dizzy	10/2014	EOL
1.6	Daisy	04/2014	EOL
1.5	Dora	10/2013	EOL
1.4	Dylan	04/2013	EOL
1.3	Danny	10/2012	EOL
1.2	Denzil	04/2012	EOL
1.1	Edison	10/2011	EOL
1.0	Bernard	2011	EOL
0.9	Laverne	2010	EOL
Legend: Unsupported Supported Latest version Preview version Future version

== Commercial distributions ==
Several companies build commercial embedded Linux products on top of the Yocto Project, adding long-term support, security maintenance, and carrier-grade features.

Distribution	Company	Based on Yocto LTS	Support term	Key focus
Wind River Linux	Wind River Systems	Yocto 5.2 (Walnascar)	10+ years	Aerospace, defense, industrial, telecom
MontaVista Linux CGX	MontaVista	Yocto 5.0 (Scarthgap)	Up to 10 years	Telecom, IoT, 5G, network infrastructure
Mentor Embedded Linux	Siemens	Yocto Project (also Debian variant)	Commercial SLA	Industrial, medical, aerospace, defense

== See also ==
- Buildroot
- Embox
- T2 SDE
