= Toolchain =

Software development tools used in sequence

A toolchain is a set of software development tools used to build and otherwise develop software. Often, the tools are executed sequentially and form a pipeline such that the output of one tool is the input for the next. Sometimes the term is used for a set of related tools that are not necessarily executed sequentially.

A relatively common and simple toolchain consists of the tools to build for a particular operating system (OS) and CPU architecture: a compiler, a linker, and a debugger. With a cross-compiler, a toolchain can support cross-platform development.

For building more complex software systems, many other tools may be in the toolchain. For example, for a video game, the toolchain may include tools for preparing sound effects, music, textures, 3-dimensional models and animations, and for combining these resources into the finished product.

== See also ==
- Buildroot – Tool for building Linux
- Debian build toolchain – Set of programming tools for deploy packages for Debian repositories
- DevOps toolchain – Tools for software development
- Framework – Software that supports solution development via inversion of control
- Library – Collection of resources used to develop a computer program
- GNU toolchain – Collection of programming tools produced by the GNU Project
- LLVM – Compiler backend for multiple programming languages
