= Gupta =

Family name

- Pronunciation: /ˈɡuːptə/
- Language: Sanskrit

Origin
- Meaning: Guardian or protector
- Region of origin: India, Bangladesh

Other names
- Variant forms: Sengupta, Dasgupta

Gupta (/ˈɡuːptə/) is a common surname of Indian origin, meaning "guardian" or "protector".

== Origins and distribution ==
The name is based on the Sanskrit word गोप्तृ goptṛ, which means "guardian" or "protector".

According to historian R. C. Majumdar, the surname Gupta was adopted by several different communities in northern and eastern India at different times.

The Rāmpāl plate of the Chandra dynasty ruler Srichandra mentions a line of Brahmins who had Gupta as their surname. In Bengal region, the surname is found among Baidyas (mainly) as well as Kayasthas.

According to Tej Ram Sharma, the name Sri Gupta, "Sri" serves as an honorific title, similar to its usage for other Gupta emperors mentioned in inscriptions. If the first ruler's name had indeed been Sri Gupta, it would likely have been recorded as Sri Sri Gupta, as seen in the Deo-Barnark inscription of Jivitagupta II, where the name Srimati appears in a similar format. Therefore, if Gupta is accepted as the personal name of the dynasty's founder, it would indicate that the Gupta suffix did not function as a surname during that period.

The Gupta surname is also used by Banias and Jains in the northern part of India.

== Notable people with the surname ==
=== In academia ===
- Akhil Gupta (born 1959), professor at the University of California, Los Angeles, in the field of social and cultural anthropology
- Amar Gupta, professor and scientist
- Amlan Das Gupta, Indian professor of English in Jadavpur University, Kolkata
- Anil Kumar Gupta, Delhi based professor and policy expert on environment, climate change and disasters
- Arvind Gupta (born 1961), 13th President of the University of British Columbia
- Arvind Gupta, Indian toy inventor and populariser of science
- Devendra Prasad Gupta (1933–2017), Indian academic and a former vice-chancellor of Ranchi University
- M. G. Gupta, Urdu poet and research scholar
- Mrinal Kumar Das Gupta (1923–2005), Indian professor and scientist
- Modadugu Vijay Gupta (born 1939), Indian biologist
- Narmada Prasad Gupta
- Neena Gupta, Indian mathematician
- Sanjay Gupta, American neurosurgeon and medical reporter
- S. P. Gupta, Indian archaeologist and art historian
- Suraj N. Gupta (1924–2021), Indian-American physicist
- Taruna Madan Gupta, Indian Clinical pharmaceutical scientist

=== In armed forces ===
- Vivek Gupta (major) (1970–1999), Indian army officer

=== In business and management ===
- Ajit Gupta, founder of Aryaka
- Aman Gupta, founder and CEO of Boat
- Anant Gupta, former CEO and President of HCL Technologies
- Anil Rai Gupta, chairman and CEO of Havells
- Desh Bandhu Gupta, was an Indian billionaire, philanthropist, entrepreneur and the founder of Lupin Limited
- Gupta family, well known South African family with significant business interests whose most notable members are the brothers Ajay, Atul and Rajesh Gupta
- Himanshu Gupta, co-founder and CEO of ClimateAI
- Mahendra Mohan Gupta, owner of the Dainik Jagran group of Hindi newspapers
- Naren Gupta (1948–2021), Indian-American entrepreneur
- Nilesh Gupta, Indian businessman, managing director of Lupin Limited
- Piyush Gupta, CEO and Director of DBS Group
- Qimat Rai Gupta was an Indian entrepreneur, founder, former chairman and managing director of Havells, a global electrical company.
- Raj Gupta, CEO and president of Rohm and Haas
- Rajat Gupta, United Nations special advisor on management reforms, former director of Goldman Sachs and former head of McKinsey & Company
- Rajiv Gupta (technocrat), general manager of Hewlett Packard's E-speak project
- S. K. Gupta, vice-president of the Lockheed Martin Corporation
- Sanjay Gupta (businessman), Indian civil servant
- Sanjay Gupta (business executive), country manager and vice-president (sales and operations) of Google India
- Sanjeev Gupta, founder of Liberty House Group
- Umang Gupta, Indian-American entrepreneur
- Vikas Gupta (businessman), Indian American internet entrepreneur, founded Jambool, an online company that was acquired by Google in 2010
- Vinita Gupta (born 1950), Indian-American businesswoman and founder of Digital Link Corporation (now Quick Eagle Networks)
- Vinita D. Gupta (born 1968/1969), Indian-American businesswoman and CEO of Lupin
- Vinod Gupta, chairman and CEO of infoUSA
- Vivek Gupta (business executive) (born 1963), president and CEO, and director on the board of Mastech Digital

=== In entertainment ===
- Aarti Gupta, winner of Miss Teen India International 2014, Indian-American model
- Additi Gupta, Indian television actress
- Ankit Gupta, Indian television actor
- Aakash Gupta, Indian comedian
- Appurv Gupta, Indian comedian
- Amrapali Gupta, Indian television actress
- Anil Gupta, British writer and producer (radio and television)
- Buddhadev Das Gupta, Indian classical sarod musician and teacher
- Esha Gupta, Femina Miss India International title in 2007, Indian film actress
- Kovid Gupta, Indian-American author, screenwriter, filmmaker, and social activist
- Manish Gupta, Indian film director
- Megha Gupta, Indian television actress
- Neena Gupta, Indian film and television actress
- Partho Sen-Gupta, Indian film director and script writer
- Puja Gupta, winner of Miss India Universe in 2007
- Rachel Gupta, Indian model and Miss Grand International 2024
- Raman Gupta, Indian actor
- Rajendra Gupta, actor in cinema for good character roles.
- Rohit Gupta, American Film director
- Sanjay Gupta, American teleneurosurgeon and CNN senior medical correspondent
- Sanjay Gupta, Bollywood director
- Siddharth Gupta, Indian actor and model
- Tanika Gupta, British playwright of Indian origin
- Vikas Gupta, Indian television producer, director and host
- Yana Gupta, Indian model-actress of Czech origin

=== In journalism ===
- Shekhar Gupta, former editor-in-chief of Indian Express

=== In law ===
- Deepak Gupta, a judge of the Supreme Court of India and former Chief Justice of the Tripura and the Chhattisgarh High Courts
- Rajiv Gupta, former Chief Justice of Chhattisgarh, Uttarakhand and Kerala High Courts
- Vanita Gupta, former head of the Civil Rights Division at the United States Department of Justice

=== In literature ===
- Maithili Sharan Gupt, Indian Hindi poet
- Baldev Raj Gupta, Indian writer
- Ishwar Chandra Gupta, Indian Bengali poet and writer
- Jagadish Gupta, Bengali poet and writer
- Mahendranath Gupta, Indian spiritual writer and disciple of Ramakrishna Paramahamsa
- Sanjay Gupta Indian comic book writer and editor
- Subhadra Sen Gupta, a historical children's writer

=== In politics ===
- Asim Dasgupta, former Finance and Excise Minister of West Bengal
- Badal Gupta, Indian revolutionary
- Banarsi Das Gupta, former Chief Minister of Haryana
- Chaman Lal Gupta, Minister in the Vajpayee Government (BJP)
- Chandra Bhanu Gupta, served three terms as Chief Minister of Uttar Pradesh
- Dinesh Gupta, Indian revolutionary
- Indrajit Gupta, Indian communist leader, Union Minister for Home Affairs during 1996–98
- Jay Prakash Gupta, former Minister of Nepal
- Kavinder Gupta, former Deputy Chief Minister of Jammu and Kashmir
- Mahesh Chandra Gupta, Indian politician (MLA of Budaun)
- Manish Gupta, MP, Rajya Sabha and former MLA from Jadavpur, Kolkata, West Bengal
- Manmath Nath Gupta, Indian revolutionary and author of autobiographical, historical and fictional books in Hindi, English and Bengali
- Niranjan Sen Gupta, Indian revolutionary
- Nolini Kanta Gupta, Indian revolutionary, linguist, scholar, critic, poet, philosopher and mystic
- Rajinder Gupta (born 1959), MP Rajya Sabha from Punjab and industrialist
- Ram Prakash Gupta, former Chief Minister of Uttar Pradesh and Governor of Madhya Pradesh
- Ram Prakash Gupta, Indian social worker and participant in the Indian Independence movement and Bhoodan movement
- Rekha Gupta, 4th female Chief Minister of Delhi
- Sanjay Gupta (Uttarakhand politician), Indian politician
- Shyama Charan Gupta, Indian politician
- Vivek Gupta (politician) (born 1975), Indian politician

=== In sports ===
- Abhijeet Gupta, Indian chess player
- Abhinn Shyam Gupta, Indian badminton player
- Deepdas Gupta, Former Indian cricketer
- Pankaj Gupta (sports administrator), Indian sports administrator
- Sandip Gupta, Kenyan cricketer

=== In art ===
- Janet Pancho Gupta, Filipino artist
- Masaba Gupta, Indian fashion designer
- Rolf Gupta, Norwegian conductor
- Subodh Gupta, Indian artist

== Fictional characters ==
- Nina Gupta (EastEnders), fictional character from the British soap opera EastEnders
