= List of IIT Roorkee people =

This is a list of notable alumni and faculty of the Indian Institute of Technology, Roorkee.

== Alumni ==
=== Arts ===
- Lala Deen Dayal, 1866, photographer to the Viceroy of India and Nizam of Hyderabad, received the Royal Warrant from Queen Victoria in 1897

=== Politics ===
- Papias Malimba Musafiri, former Cabinet Minister of Education (June 2015 - December 2017) in the Cabinet of Rwanda

=== Science and Technology ===
- Amit Singhal, former senior vice president at Google
- Digvijai Singh, chemical engineer, former vice chancellor of University of Roorkee, Shanti Swarup Bhatnagar laureate
- Shyam Sundar Rai, seismologist, Shanti Swarup Bhatnagar laureate

=== Others ===
- Anirudh Agarwal (born 1949), Indian character actor.
- G. D. Agrawal (born 1932), eminent environmental engineer, Save Ganga activist and former head of the Department of Civil and Environmental Engineering at IIT Kanpur, notable for his successful fast in 2009 to stop the damming of the Bhagirathi River
- Rakesh Agrawal (born 1954), Member, National Academy of Engineering, ex-Microsoft Fellow and ex-IBM fellow widely known as the 'Father of Data Mining'
- A. S. Arya (born c.1931), National Seismic advisor and Padma Shri awardee
- Pradip Baijal (born c.1944), IAS and former chairman Telecom Regulatory Authority of India (TRAI)
- John Underwood Bateman-Champain (1835–1887), British army officer and engineer in India, instrumental in laying the first electric telegraph line from Britain to India by way of the Persian Gulf
- Allan Joseph Champneys Cunningham (1842–1928), number theorist, formulated Mersenne numbers and Fermat numbers
- Rishi Das, entrpeneur and businessman
- Peter de Noronha (1897–1970), businessman, philanthropist, knighted by Pope Paul VI in 1965 for his work for the Christian community in India
- Jaiprakash Gaur (born c.1930), founder chairman of Jaiprakash Associates and Jaypee Group of companies, ranked by Forbes magazine as the 48th-richest person in India
- Raj Kumar Goyal, Chief Information Commissioner of India
- Ajit Gupta (born 1962), founder, president, CEO of Aryaka; founder, chairman of AAyuja; founder, ex-CEO of Speedera; founder, chairman of Jantakhoj
- Harsh Gupta (born 1942), Indian earth scientist and seismologist, known for his pioneering work on estimation of reservoir-induced earthquakes.
- Vinita Gupta (born 1949), founder, CEO of Quick Eagle Networks and first Indian-origin-woman to take her company public
- Naveen Jain (born 1959), founder and CEO of Intelius, founder of Moon Express, InfoSpace
- Sudhir K. Jain (born 1959), former Vice Chancellor of Banaras Hindu University
- Sumit Jain (born 1984), co-founder and CEO of Opentalk | co-founder and ex-CEO of Indian real estate portal Commonfloor.com
- Chaudhry Niaz Ali Khan (1880–1976), founder of the Dar ul Islam Movement and the Dar ul Islam Trust in South Asia and the Dar ul Islam Trust Institutes in Pathankot, India and Jauharabad, Pakistan
- Ajudhiya Nath Khosla (1892–1984), eminent Indian engineer, educationist, visionary and recipient of second highest civilian honor of India — Padma Vibhushan, awarded in 1977, served as member of the Planning Commission, Governor of Orissa, president of National Science Academy and vice chancellor of the University of Roorkee (now IIT Roorkee)
- Jai Krishna (1912–1999), eminent scholar on earthquake engineering, instrumental in setting up the first and the only earthquake engineering department in India, at IIT Roorkee, awarded Padma Bhushan in 1956, served as Vice Chancellor of the University of Roorkee in 1969
- Prof. Rajeev Kumar, (born 1959) Indian Computer Scientist and Whistleblower
- Rajeev Kumar (born 1966), former DGP of West Bengal
- Henry Benedict Medlicott (1829–1905), Irish geologist and professor of geology
- Nilmani Mitra (1828–1894), 19th century architect, designer of several palaces in Kolkata
- Sri Niwas, (1946–2012) geophysicist, Shanti Swarup Bhatnagar laureate
- Ghananand Pande (1902–1995), chairman of Indian Railways in 1954 and chairman of Hindustan Steels, awarded the Padma Vibhushan in 1969
- Frederic Oscar Oertel (1862–1942), Indian art historian and archaeologist
- Charles Palmer (1847–1940), last surviving man to hold the Lucknow medal for his role in the defence of the Residency in Lucknow during the Indian Rebellion of 1857
- Narendra Patni (1943–2014), founder, chairman, and chief executive officer of Patni Computer Systems
- Sir Ganga Ram (1851–1927), a leading philanthropist and agriculturist. A civil engineer by profession and a graduate of the 1873 batch, Sir Ganga Ram supervised the construction of several prominent structures in Punjab. Referred to as 'Father of modern Lahore'.
- Krishna R. Reddy, civil and environmental engineer known for his research in geotechnical and geoenvironmental engineering.
- Kanwar Sen (1899–1979), Chief Engineer of Bikaner credited with the creation of the Indira Gandhi canal in Rajasthan and Punjab, awarded Padma Bhushan in 1956
- Ajay Seth, Chairman of Insurance Regulatory and Development Authority of India
- S.V. Setty (1879–1918), The first Indian Aviator
- Baba Sawan Singh (1858–1948), second Satguru of Radha Soami Satsang Beas
- Mangu Singh (born 1955), managing director of Delhi Metro Rail Corporation Limited
- Prakash Kumar Singh, former chairman of Steel Authority of India Limited
- William Willcocks (1852–1932), British civil engineer who graduated from 1872 batch, remembered as a renowned irrigation engineer, having proposed the first Aswan Dam and undertaken major projects of irrigation in South Africa and Turkey

== Faculty ==
- Deepak Kumar, condensed matter physicist and Shanti Swarup Bhatnagar Prize recipient
- Pravindra Kumar, bioinformatician
- Vinod Kumar Gaur, seismologist and former director of the National Geophysical Research Institute
- M. R. Kabir, Bangladeshi academic
- Prof. Allan J.C.Cunningham, a British Indian Mathematician who pioneered research on Cunningham numbers, Cunningham chain and started the Cunningham Project, all named after him. He taught at IIT Roorkee from 1871 to 1881.
