= Anil Gupta =

Anil Gupta may refer to:

- Anil Gupta (philosopher) (born 1949), Indian-American philosopher
- Anil Gupta (writer) (born 1974), British comedy writer and producer
- Anil Rai Gupta (born 1969), Indian businessman
- Anil Das Gupta (1922–1990), Indian cricketer
- Anil K. Gupta (scholar) (born 1949), American academic in the area of business strategy
- Anil Kumar Gupta, scholar in the area of grassroots innovations
