= PSOS =

PSOS, PSOs or pSOS may refer to:

- pSOS (real-time operating system)
- Provably Secure Operating System
- Project Support Open Source
- Protective services officers
- The Police Service of Scotland

== See also ==
- pSOS+
