= Vikas Gupta (disambiguation) =

Vikas Gupta may refer to:

- Vikas Gupta (born 1988), Indian television producer, creative director and host known for participating in Bigg Boss 11
- Vikas Gupta (politician), Indian politician from Fatehpur, Uttar Pradesh, affiliated with Bhartiya Janata Party
- Vikas Gupta (businessman), Indian American internet entrepreneur
