= HyperTrack =

- Website type: Location-based service, Software development kit, API
- Founded: October 1, 2015; 10 years ago
- Headquarters: San Francisco, California
- Services: Live Location on iOS, Android, Web, API, Webhooks
- Current status: Active

HyperTrack is live location platform in the cloud offering developer tools for mobile application developers in companies of all sizes worldwide. Its toolset contains iOS, and Android SDKs which generate live location data, that is then consumed through webhooks, APIs or visual experiences on the web, iOS and Android. Developers have used HyperTrack to build applications like sales-force automation, service fleet efficiency, vehicle asset tracking, delivery tracking, gig economy, live location sharing, automated mileage tracking and expensing.

== History ==
HyperTrack was founded by Indian serial entrepreneur, Kashyap Deorah along with Tapan Pandita and Abhishek Poddar, in 2015. In 2016, HyperTrack raised a $1.5 million seed round of funding from the Junglee mafia—Venky Harinarayan, Anand Rajaraman, Ashish Gupta and Rakesh Mathur, Vy Capital, Social Capital, Zomato founder Deepinder Goyal, and Investopad founders Rohan Malhotra and Arjun Malhotra. In early 2017, the company raised a $7 million Series A investment led by Naren Gupta from Nexus Venture Partners along with Kevin Hartz from Founders Fund.

HyperTrack has offices in San Francisco, Zaporizhia and Bangalore.
