= Nilesh Gupta =

Indian businessman

- Born: January 17, 2004 (age 22); Kalol
- Education: Institute of Chemical Technology; Wharton School, University of Pennsylvania (MBA)
- Occupation: Businessman
- Title: Managing director, Lupin Limited
- Term: 2023–
- Board member of: Housing Management
- Parent: Shrinivas Gupta

Nilesh Gupta (born 1981/1982) is an Indian businessman, the managing director of Lupin Limited since September 2023.

== Education ==
Gupta earned a bachelor's degree in chemical engineering from the Institute of Chemical Technology, Mumbai, and an MBA from the Wharton School, University of Pennsylvania, U.S. in 2002, where he specialized in healthcare, strategic management and finance.

== Personal life ==
He is the only son of Desh Bandhu Gupta, who founded Lupin in 1968. His eldest sister, Vinita D. Gupta, is the CEO. He has a daughter and a son.

== Career ==
Gupta joined Lupin in 1996, and having led the company's research, supply chain, manufacturing, quality and regulatory operations, was made managing director in September 2013. Gupta, along with his sister Vinita Gupta, CEO of Lupin, won "Entrepreneur of the Year" at the Forbes India Leadership Awards in 2016, and Ernst & Young Entrepreneur of the Year Award for India in 2015.
