= Anil K. Gupta (scholar) =

American professor

- Born: September 24, 1949 (age 77)
- Occupations: Academic, strategy scholar
- Title: Michael D. Dingman Chair in Strategy, Globalization, & Entrepreneurship

Academic background
- Education: Indian Institute of Technology at Kanpur; Indian Institute of Management at Ahmedabad; Harvard University
- Thesis: "The Process of Strategy Formation" (1980)
- Website: www.anilkgupta.com

Anil K. Gupta (born September 24, 1949) is an American academic specializing in business strategy. He holds the Michael D. Dingman Chair in Strategy, Globalization, and Entrepreneurship at University of Maryland’s Robert H. Smith School of Business and is an Affiliate Faculty with the Artificial Intelligence Interdisciplinary Institute at Maryland. Gupta is also the author of the newsletter Inconvenient AI.

Gupta has also served as a Chaired Professor in Strategy at INSEAD and a Visiting Professor at Stanford University’s Stanford Technology Ventures Program, Dartmouth College’s Tuck School of Business, and Tsinghua University’s School of Economics and Management.

Gupta is the author or co-author of over 70 papers in prestigious academic journals and several books including The Quest for Global Dominance: Transforming Global Presence into Global Competitive Advantage, Global Strategy and Organization, Getting China and India Right: Strategies for Leveraging the World's Fastest-Growing Economies for Global Advantage, and The Silk Road Rediscovered: How Indian and Chinese Companies Are Becoming Globally Stronger by Competing in Each Other's Markets. His 2010 book Getting China and India Right (co-authored with Haiyan Wang) was short-listed for the Asia Society’s Annual Bernard Schwartz Book Award and won the Axiom Book Awards’ Silver Prize for Best Book in Globalization/International Business.

Ranked by Thinkers50 as one of the world's most influential management thinkers, and inducted into the Thinkers50 Hall of Fame.

He has been named by The Economist as one of the world's "superstars" in a cover story on innovation in emerging markets. He is also the recipient of the 2023 C.K. Prahalad Award for Scholarly Impact on Practice from the Strategic Management Society for excellence in the application of theory and research in practice , and the 2017 Outstanding Educator Award from the Academy of Management's International Management Division for worldwide contribution to research, practice, and teaching on the topic of globalization.

A periodically updated list by Stanford researchers ranks Gupta among the top 2% of the most-cited scientists worldwide across all fields of natural and social sciences. In 2020, Journal of International Business Studies ranked one of Gupta’s papers as the #1 most cited and another paper as the #4 most cited in the entire research literature on the subject of “Managing the Multinational Enterprise.” Two of Gupta’s PhD students (Antoaneta Petkova and Harry Sapienza) have been winners of the prestigious Heizer Best Dissertation Award from the Entrepreneurship Division of the Academy of Management.

Gupta is a Fellow of Academy of Management, Strategic Management Society, and Academy of International Business. He is an invited member of CNBC Disrupters 50 Advisory Council, The Bretton Woods Committee, and the World Economic Forum’s Stewardship Board for the System Initiative on the Future of Consumption. He is a frequent speaker at the World Economic Forum’s annual meetings in Davos and its regional summits, and is a member of the Forum’s Global Expert Network.

== Education ==
Gupta earned a Bachelor of Technology degree in mechanical engineering from the Indian Institute of Technology at Kanpur in 1970, a Master of Business Administration degree from the Indian Institute of Management at Ahmedabad in 1972, and a Doctor of Business Administration degree in business strategy from Harvard Business School in 1980.

During his doctoral studies Gupta was recognized as an Outstanding Doctoral Student and awarded the prestigious Arthur D. Little Foundation Fellowship.

== Career ==
Upon graduation from Harvard University, Gupta joined the School of Management at Boston University as an Assistant Professor of Management Policy. During his six-year tenure at Boston University, he established an early reputation as a productive researcher in strategic management, organizational behavior, and corporate strategy. His research examined the determinants of effective governance structures, systems, and processes through which a corporate center manages business units. In 1984, he received Boston University's Broderick Prize for Excellence in Research.

In 1986 Gupta joined the Robert H. Smith School of Business at the University of Maryland, College Park, an institution with which he would remain associated for the rest of his academic career. He was promoted to Full Professor in 1992, reflecting the growing impact of his research in strategic management and international business.

Over the following decades, Gupta occupied several distinguished professorships at the University of Maryland. In 2001, he was named the Ralph J. Tyser Professor of Strategy and Organization, and in 2009 he was appointed the Michael D. Dingman Chair in Strategy and Entrepreneurship, one of the school's most prestigious endowed professorships. The chair recognized his international standing as a scholar of strategy and entrepreneurship as well as his contributions to executive education and research leadership.

At the Smith School, Gupta has taught courses in corporate strategy, global strategy, international business, innovation management, and entrepreneurship at the undergraduate, MBA, executive MBA, doctoral, and executive education levels. His classes are widely recognized for combining rigorous academic research with practical applications drawn from corporations and rapidly evolving global industries. He has supervised numerous doctoral dissertations, many of whose authors subsequently joined leading business schools throughout North America, Europe, and Asia. Two of Gupta’s PhD students (Antoaneta Petkova and Harry Sapienza) received the prestigious Heizer Best Dissertation Award from the Entrepreneurship Division of the Academy of Management.

Gupta has held leadership positions in several academic organizations, including serving as Chair, International Management Division, Academy of Management (2009-2010), and Member of the Executive Committee, Business Policy & Strategy Division, Academy of Management (1992-1994). He has also held editorial positions with leading journals including Academy of Management Journal, Academy of Management Review, Organization Science, Information Systems Research, Global Strategy Journal, Strategic Entrepreneurship Journal, and Journal of International Business Studies.

Outside academia, Gupta has served on the boards of several technology companies, including NeoMagic Corporation (listed on NASDAQ), Omega Worldwide Inc. (listed on NASDAQ), Vitalink Pharmacy Services (listed on NYSE), and Origene Technologies (a VC-backed startup).

Gupta's commentary and research have appeared in publications including Harvard Business Review, The Wall Street Journal, Financial Times, Bloomberg Businessweek, The Daily Telegraph, and China Daily. He has also been interviewed by media outlets including The Economist, The Washington Post, Forbes, BBC, CNBC, Bloomberg, and Reuters.

Gupta’s recent research examines artificial intelligence, technological entrepreneurship, and environmental, social, and governance strategies. In 2024, he became a co-principal investigator on a National Science Foundation-funded project examining corporate ESG engagement using labor-market data.

== Research and scholarship ==
Anil K. Gupta's research has centered on impact of AI on labor market demand, strategic management, international business, innovation, multinational corporations, and the transformation of global competition. Over more than four decades, his scholarship has combined insights from strategy, organizational theory, entrepreneurship, and international management to examine how firms create, transfer, and sustain competitive advantage in increasingly interconnected markets. His work has been particularly influential in advancing understanding of global strategy, knowledge management, emerging economies, and technological innovation, and has shaped both academic research and management practice.

A distinguishing feature of Gupta's scholarship is its integration of rigorous theoretical frameworks with practical managerial applications. While grounded in strategic management theory, his research has consistently addressed issues faced by corporations, entrepreneurs, policymakers, and executives navigating globalization and technological change. His publications have appeared in leading journals including the Strategic Management Journal, Academy of Management Journal, Academy of Management Review, Organization Science, Information Systems Research, Journal of International Business Studies, Sloan Management Review, and Business Horizons. Through his books, journal articles, and executive education programs, Gupta has influenced the study and practice of business strategy across academia and industry.

=== Imapct of AI on Labor Market Demand ===
Gupta’s current research focuses on the diffusion of AI through the American economy and its impact on labor market demand. He is the Co-Lead of the UMD-LinkUp AI Maps Project. A key output of this project is a data tracker that, based on nearly 100% of all job postings in the economy, tracks labor market demand for AI jobs, IT jobs, and all jobs across MSAs, counties, and states, across industry sectors, and across different types of occupations.

Based on an analysis of the comprehensive data on job postings, Gupta and his team have published a number of white papers. These include: (a) From West to the Rest: Growing Geographic Dispersion of AI Jobs in America, (b) Diffusion of AI Jobs Across Economic Sectors, and (c) Tribal Tales vs Hard Data: AI’s Impact on Demand for Fresh Graduates. Insights from this project have been covered by reporters in several top-tier media including The Wall Street Journal, BusinessWeek, Axios, CNN Business, ABC News, Business Insider, CEO Magazine, and other outlets.

=== Strategy and globalization ===
Global strategy has been a major theme of Gupta's academic career. Starting from the late 1980s, his research examined how multinational corporations develop and sustain competitive advantage across national markets, emphasizing that globalization requires more than geographic expansion. Instead, he argued that firms must integrate geographically dispersed resources, capabilities, and knowledge into coherent global strategies.

Together with Vijay Govindarajan, Gupta developed influential frameworks explaining how multinational enterprises can transform global presence into global competitive advantage. Their research proposed that successful global firms simultaneously pursue worldwide efficiency, local responsiveness, and organizational learning rather than treating these objectives as mutually exclusive. This work helped shift management scholarship away from viewing globalization primarily as market expansion toward understanding it as the building and deployment of organizational capabilities involving coordination, integration, and knowledge sharing across international operations.

These ideas were developed further in books such as The Quest for Global Dominance (2001; 2nd edition 2008), Global Strategy and Organization (2003), and Smart Globalization (2003).

Gupta has also examined the strategic implications of digitization, global dispersion of supply chains, and technological change, arguing that globalization increasingly depends on firms' ability to integrate dispersed innovation ecosystems rather than merely coordinating manufacturing and distribution activities.

=== Emerging economies and global business ===
Another major theme of Gupta's scholarship concerns the growing importance of emerging economies. Long before China and India became central subjects within management research, Gupta argued that their economic resurgence would fundamentally reshape international competition and global business strategy.

His work challenged the prevailing assumption that multinational corporations from developed economies would remain the dominant actors in globalization. Instead, he predicted that firms headquartered in emerging economies would join the ranks of global competitors by combining lower-cost capabilities with expanding technological sophistication, managerial expertise, and international ambition.

These ideas received broad attention through Getting China and India Right (2009), co-authored with Haiyan Wang. The book examined how multinational corporations could leverage the rapid growth of the world's two largest emerging economies while simultaneously responding to the rise of globally competitive Chinese and Indian enterprises. Rather than treating China and India as similar investment destinations, Gupta argued that each possessed distinct institutional environments, innovation systems, and competitive advantages requiring different strategic approaches.

His subsequent book, The Silk Road Rediscovered (2014), extended this analysis by exploring how Chinese and Indian companies increasingly competed within one another's domestic markets while simultaneously expanding internationally. Gupta argued that competition between these two emerging economic powers would become one of the defining features of twenty-first-century globalization.

=== Innovation and technology management ===
His publications have investigated the balance between organizational exploration and exploitation, highlighting the challenge organizations face in simultaneously pursuing incremental improvements while investing in disruptive innovation. His widely cited article with Ken Smith and Christina Shalley, "The Interplay Between Exploration and Exploitation" in Academy of Management Journal, synthesized decades of research and became a foundational contribution to innovation management literature.

Gupta has also explored innovation across multiple organizational levels, including individuals, teams, business units, and multinational corporations. Through collaborative work published in Organization Science and other journals, he argued that innovation emerges through interactions between organizational structures, leadership, culture, incentives, and knowledge-sharing systems rather than through isolated research and development activities.

More recently, his research has expanded to examine artificial intelligence, machine learning, digital transformation, and environmental, social, and governance (ESG) strategies, applying computational methods to understand organizational capabilities and competitive behavior.

=== Global R&D and knowledge management ===
Among Gupta's most influential scholarly contributions is his work on knowledge management within multinational corporations. His research fundamentally changed understanding of how organizations create, transfer, and utilize knowledge across geographically dispersed operations.

His article "Knowledge Flows Within Multinational Corporations," published in the Strategic Management Journal in 2000 with Vijay Govindarajan, is regarded as one of the landmark studies in international management. The article demonstrated that competitive advantage increasingly depends on firms' ability to facilitate multidirectional knowledge flows among headquarters, regional offices, research laboratories, and foreign subsidiaries rather than relying on traditional top-down organizational structures.

Complementary studies examined the assignment of research and development responsibilities to foreign subsidiaries, organizational learning, knowledge spillovers, feedback-seeking behavior, and the social dimensions of knowledge management. Together, these publications established Gupta as one of the leading scholars of organizational knowledge transfer and multinational learning.

His work has influenced both academic research and corporate practice by emphasizing that global organizations must develop institutional mechanisms supporting collaboration, trust, and knowledge exchange across national and organizational boundaries.

== Awards and honors ==
- 1984 - Broderick Prize for Excellence in Research, Boston University.
- 1992 - Glueck Best Paper Award, Business Policy and Strategy Division, Academy of Management.
- 1994 - Ranked as one of the "Top 20 North American Superstars" for research in strategy and organization, Management International Review.
- 1998 - Allen J. Krowe Award for Excellence in Teaching, Robert H. Smith School of Business, University of Maryland at College Park.
- 1997-1998 - Distinguished Scholar-Teacher Award, University of Maryland
- 2000 - Included in the Academy of Management Journals’ Hall of Fame
- 2004-2006 - Guest Editor, Academy of Management Journal special issue on “Managing Exploration and Exploitation” (co-editors: Ken Smith and Chris Shalley).
- 2005-2007 - Guest Editor, Organization Science special issue on “Innovation Research At and Across Levels” (co-editors: Susan Taylor and Paul Tesluk).
- 2006-2008 - Guest Editor, Information Systems Research special issue on “The Interplay Between Digital and Social Networks” (co-editors: Ritu Agarwal and Robert Kraut).
- 2010 - Elected life-time Fellow, Academy of International Business
- 2010 - Axiom Book Awards’ Silver Prize for Best Book in Globalization/International Business for Getting China and India Right
- July 2010 - Best Professor in Strategy Award from CMO Asia.
- 2010 - Elected life-time Fellow, Strategic Management Society
- 2012 - Elected life-time Fellow, Academy of Management
- 2013, 2015, 2017, 2019 - Included in Thinkers 50’s biannual list of the world’s 50 most influential management thinkers
- 2017-18 - Distinguished Teaching Award, Smith School of Business, the University of Maryland
- 2017 - Outstanding Educator Award, International Management Division, Academy of Management
- 2023 - C.K. Prahalad Award for Scholarly Impact on Practice, Strategic Management Society
- 2024 – Inducted into the Thinkers50 Hall of Fame

== Bibliography ==
=== Books ===
- The Quest for Global Dominance: Transforming Global Presence into Global Competitive Advantage (2001) ISBN 978-0787957216
- Smart Globalization: Designing Global Strategies, Creating Global Networks (2003) ISBN 978-0787965327
- Global Strategy and Organization (2004) ISBN 978-0471250296
- The Quest for Global Dominance: Transforming Global Presence into Global Competitive Advantage, 2nd Edition (2008) ISBN 978-0470194409
- Getting China and India Right: Strategies for Leveraging the World’s Fastest-Growing Economies for Global Advantage (2009) ISBN 978-0470284247
- Global Strategies for Emerging Asia. (2012) ISBN 978-1118217979
- The Silk Road Rediscovered: How Indian and Chinese Companies Are Becoming Globally Stronger by Competing in Each Other's Markets (2014) ISBN 978-1118446232

=== Selected articles ===
- Gupta, A.K., & Govindarajan, V. 1984. Business unit strategy, managerial characteristics, and business unit effectiveness at strategy implementation. Academy of Management Journal, 27 (1): 25-41.
- Gupta, A.K., & Govindarajan, V. 1991. Knowledge flows and the structure of control within multinational firms. Academy of Management Review, 16: 768-792.
- Gupta, A.K., & Govindarajan, V. 2000. Knowledge management’s social dimension: Lessons from Nucor Steel. Sloan Management Review. Fall: 71-80.
- Gupta, A.K., & Govindarajan, V. 2000. Knowledge flows within multinational corporations. Strategic Management Journal. 21: 473-496.
- Feinberg, S.E., Gupta, A.K. 2004. Knowledge spillovers and the assignment of R&D responsibilities to foreign subsidiaries. Strategic Management Journal. 25: 823-845.
- Gupta, A.K., Smith, K.G., & Shalley, C. 2006. The interplay between exploration and exploitation. Academy of Management Journal. 49: 693-706.
- Zhang, L., Gupta, A.K., & Hallen, B. 2017. The Conditional Importance of Prior Ties: A Group-Level Analysis of Venture Capital Syndication. Academy of Management Journal. 60(4): 1360-1386.
