= Naren Gupta =

Indian-American venture capitalist and entrepreneur (1948–2021)

- Born: 30 September 1948
- Died: 25 December 2021 (aged 73)
- Education: Indian Institute of Technology, Delhi; California Institute of Technology; Stanford University
- Occupations: computer scientist and venture capitalist

Narendra K. Gupta (30 September 1948 – 25 December 2021) was an Indian-American venture capital investor and technology entrepreneur. He founded the investment company Nexus Venture Partners, as well as various other investment and software firms. He was also CEO and president of Integrated Systems Inc. (ISI) for a decade and a half. In a career spanning over three decades he was recognized for his contributions to global technology and entrepreneurial ecosystems, and for venture capital investments in India.

== Early life ==
Gupta was born on 30 September 1948. He received a Bachelor of Technology degree from the Indian Institute of Technology, Delhi, in 1969 majoring in mechanical engineering. He moved to the United States and received a Master of Science degree from the California Institute of Technology, in 1970 with a specialization in aeronautics and a Ph.D. from Stanford University in 1974 with a specialization in applied mechanics. He was a recipient of the president's gold medal for his performance at IIT Delhi and later received distinguished alumni awards from IIT in 1997 and from Caltech in 2004. He was also elected a fellow of the Institute of Electrical and Electronics Engineers in 1991.

== Career ==
Gupta co-founded Integrated Systems Inc., an embedded software company, in 1980 and was the company's CEO for 15 years. In 1990, he took the company went public, and later merged with Wind River Systems. He remained on that board until it was acquired by Intel. He had more than two decades of experience in the field of early and early-growth stage investment in both America and India.

=== Nexus Venture Partners ===
In 2007, Gupta founded Nexus Venture Partners, a Silicon Valley investment firm, with offices in Menlo Park, California, and Mumbai and Bangalore in India. This is a "homegrown Indian operation [with] extensive reach and experience overseas [most notably in] Silicon Valley." It has made investments in a variety of technical and media startups around India and the United States. As of 2016, the company had $1bn under management with an active portfolio of 60-plus firms across industries: business services, consumer, healthcare, internet and technology.

Gupta, via Nexus, had made investments in several developers' products including HyperTrack, H2O, and Postman. He also had investments in cloud computing and other e-commerce companies including Aryaka, DimDim, Druva, mCheck, PubMatic and Snapdeal. These companies were primarily developed by Indian entrepreneurs to serve international markets.

=== India advocacy ===
Operating out of Silicon Valley, Gupta was an advocate for driving investments in the Indian technology and startup ecosystem. In a 2012 interview with The Wall Street Journal, Gupta had predicted that, within a few years, India would be building "billion-dollar startups". He said that the traditional approach to investment used in Silicon Valley is not really accepted in India. He sees a great deal of "untapped potential" in software industries like cloud computing and mobile apps. Yet there are "special challenges" for those investing in India. Gupta expanded: "Certainly fast-growing startups need more hand-holding than they need in the U.S. While we have quite a bit of technology talent in India, we don't have leadership and marketing talent." Plus, there is often a push from Indian entrepreneurs to sell earlier than they should, rather than waiting to develop a "billion dollar enterprise over many years".

Through Nexus, Gupta has developed a greater sense of how to work within Indian culture. He said that, "most investors in the U.S. won't understand how family-run businesses in India run." Basically, Indian entrepreneurs have to get with the program in order to understand "what tickles the fancy of consumers", since there has not been one independent firm that has emerged as a key player here, which Gupta says "makes no sense. Korea has done that, Japan has, China has, but not India."

Regarding Indian e-commerce, Gupta said that this recently exploded. He said that "every investor wanted to be an e-commerce investor – valuations were doubling every month. It was completely ridiculous." Now that euphoria has dissipated.

Gupta had helped organize the Indian Prime Minister Narendra Modi's visit to the United States and to Silicon Valley in the summer of 2015. Gupta was quoted as saying "Innovation is a state of mind, and he is saying, help him bring that state of mind to India. Big changes are pretty much impossible to make. What you need to do in a democracy is take a thousand little steps."

=== Board memberships ===
Gupta was chairman of the board at Red Hat, and a member of the Board of Trustees of the California Institute of Technology and the Asia Society of Northern California. He also sat on the boards of a variety of privately held companies. In 2021, Gupta, along with his wife, instituted a fellowship at Caltech toward research on smart devices and artificial intelligence as a part of the institute's Sensing to Intelligence initiative.

== Personal life ==
Gupta was married to Vinita Gupta. The couple had two daughters.

Gupta died on 25 December 2021, at the age of 73. Nexus Venture Partners published a statement on Naren Gupta's death on 26 December 2021. Reports on his death recognized his contributions to global technology and entrepreneurial ecosystems and called him "a pioneer of Indian venture capital".
