= Krishna R. Reddy =

Geoenvironmental and Sustainability Academic

Professor Krishna R. Reddy
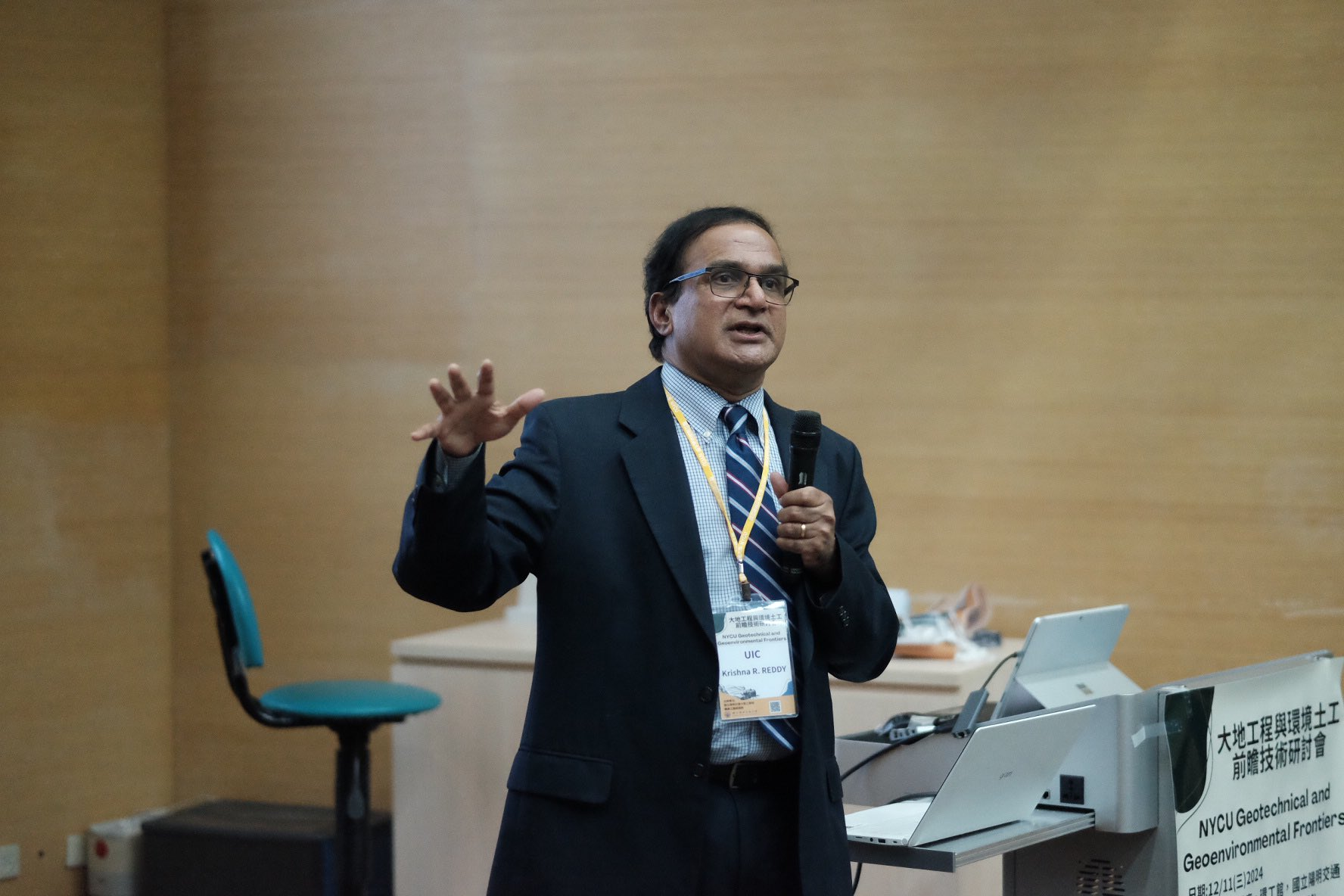
- Education: Ph.D., Civil Engineering, Illinois Institute of Technology, Chicago, Illinois, 1990; M.S., Civil Engineering, Indian Institute of Technology, Roorkee, India, 1985; B.S., Civil Engineering, Osmania University, Hyderabad, India, 1983
- Awards: Hogentogler Award, ASTM (2011); Wesley W. Horner Award, EWRI, ASCE (2018); Fulbright Academic & Professional Excellence Award (Teaching & Research), U.S. Department of State (2022); G.A. Leonards Lecture, Purdue University (2023)
- Scientific career
- Workplaces: University of Illinois Chicago
- Website: cme.uic.edu/profiles/krishna/

Prof. Krishna R. Reddy is a university scholar, researcher, professor of civil and environmental engineering, and the Director of both the Sustainable Engineering Research Laboratory (SERL) and the Geotechnical and Geoenvironmental Engineering Laboratory (GAGEL) in the Department of Civil, Materials, and Environmental Engineering (CME) at the University of Illinois Chicago (UIC).

== Education ==
Prof. Reddy received PhD in Civil Engineering from the Illinois Institute of Technology, Chicago, in 1990. He received gold medals for being first in both BS (Civil Engineering) at the Osmania University, India, in 1983 and MS (Civil Engineering) at the Indian Institute of Technology, Roorkee, India, in 1985.

== Career and research ==
Reddy worked for three years in consulting as a Geotechnical /Geoenvironmental Engineer, before joining UIC. He specializes in Geotechnical and Geoenvironmental Engineering, along with Sustainable and Resilient Engineering, with a particular emphasis on environmental remediation, waste management & landfill design, AI/ML/DL applications, and the development and applications of sustainability and resilience frameworks. His research is funded by the U.S. National Science Foundation, the U.S. Environmental Protection Agency, several prominent state and local government agencies, and industries. His research includes laboratory studies, field experiments, and computer modeling, ultimately leading to fundamental advances and practical solutions to real-world problems.

Reddy has served or currently serves as an Associate Editor or Editorial Board Member of over ten different journals, including ASCE Journal of Geotechnical and Geoenvironmental Engineering, ASTM Geotechnical Testing Journal, ASCE Journal of Hazardous, Toxic and Radioactive Waste, Journal of Hazardous Materials, among others. He has also served on various professional committees, including the Geoenvironmental Engineering Committee and Technical Coordinating Council of Geo-Institute (GI) of the American Society of Civil Engineers (ASCE) and the Environmental Geotechnics Committee of International Society of Soil Mechanics and Geotechnical Engineering (ISSMGE).

=== Honors and awards ===
- 2007: Award for Excellence in Teaching, University of Illinois at Chicago
- 2007: University Scholar Award, University of Illinois
- 2011: Hogentogler Award, American Society of Testing and Materials (ASTM)
- 2018: Wesley W. Horner Award, Environmental & Water Resources Institute (EWRI), American Society of Civil Engineers (ASCE)
- 2022: Fulbright Academic & Professional Excellence Award (Teaching & Research), U.S. Department of State
- 2023: G.A. Leonards Lecture, Purdue Geotechnical Society, Purdue University
