= Haiyan Wang =

American engineer

- Born: China
- Awards: Presidential Early Career Award for Scientists and Engineers

Academic background
- Education: BS, 1998, Nanchang University; MS, 1999, Institute of Metal Research; PhD, Materials Science and Engineering, 2002, North Carolina State University
- Thesis: Process and properties of nitride-based thin film heterostructures (2002)
- Doctoral advisor: Jagdish Nararyan

Haiyan Wang is the Basil S. Turner Professor of Engineering at Purdue University's School of Materials Engineering and the School of Electrical and Computer Engineering. Wang conducts research in the areas of high-temperature superconductors, coated conductors, nanostructured functional ceramics for solid oxide fuel cells, plasmonics and photonics, ferroelectric and multiferroics, radiation tolerance materials, and bulk structural metals and ceramics.

== Early life and education ==
Wang was born and raised in China. She obtained her Bachelor of Science degree and Master's degree from Nanchang University and Institute of Metal Research. She earned her PhD from North Carolina State University in 2002 under the supervision of Jagdish Nararyan. She joined Los Alamos National Laboratory, as a postdoctoral fellow.

== Career & Awards ==
Wang joined the faculty at Texas A&M University as an assistant professor in 2006. She joined Purdue University in August 2016 as the Basil S. Turner Professor of Engineering at Purdue University's School of Materials Engineering and the School of Electrical and Computer Engineering.

She received the Air Force Young Investigators Research Grant and the Presidential Early Career Award for Scientists and Engineers.

She is Fellow of the ASM International, the American Association for the Advancement of Science, the American Ceramic Society, the American Physical Society and the Materials Research Society. and the National Academy of Inventors".
