= Ghananand Pande =

Indian scientist

Dr. Ghananand Pande
- Born: 1 January 1902; Ranikhet, Almora district in Uttarakhand, India
- Education: B.E. in Civil Engineering
- Alma mater: IIT Roorkee (then Thomson College of Civil Engineering)
- Employers: Chairman of Railway Board (1954-57); Chairman of Hindustan Steel (1957-60); Vice-chancellor of Roorkee University (1961-66)

Ghananand Pande (1 January 1902 – c. 1995) was an Indian engineer and a civil servant. He held key positions in the Government of India and contributed to engineering education reforms in India. In 1969, he received the Padma Vibhushan award, the second highest civilian award of India.

== Early life and career ==
Pande was born in Ranikhet, a small town in Almora district in present-day state of Uttarakhand. Pande completed his primary and secondary schooling in Almora and Nainital. Pande pursued higher education at Allahabad University, where he earned his undergraduate degree with first-division honors in 1922. He subsequently obtained a B.E. in Civil Engineering from Thomson College of Civil Engineering, now known as Indian Institute of Technology Roorkee, in 1925.

Pande started his professional career as an engineer in Indian Railways and worked in various engineering capacities until 1947. He was instrumental in several key projects, including his tenure as the General Manager in North Eastern Railway from 1950 to 1952, and as General Manager overseeing the Ganga Bridge Project at Mokama. He retired in 1957 as chairman of the Railway Board and secretary of the Ministry of Railways in the Government of India, after serving in those positions for three years. From 1958 to 1960, he was chairman of the Steel Board, and from 1961 to 1966 he served as vice-chancellor of the University of Roorkee. Between 1966 and 1973, he held additional senior positions in the Government of India.

Following his retirement from the Railway Board, Pande continued to hold prominent roles in India's industrial and educational spheres. From 1957 to 1960, he served as first the chairman of Hindustan Steel, overseeing the establishment of three major public sector steel plants in Bhilai, Rourkela, and Durgapur. He proposed a baby car project in 1960–61 and recommended that small cars be manufactured in India. He later transitioned to academia, serving as the vice-chancellor of Roorkee University (now IIT Roorkee), during his tenure he established a centre of Institution of Engineers (India) at the university. He left the position voluntarily.

== Recognition ==
He received an honorary Doctor of Engineering degree from the University of Roorkee and an honorary Doctor of Science degree from Kumaon University in recognition of his contributions to engineering education. He was also awarded Padma Vibhushan in 1969 for his service to public administration. He was nominated by the state of Uttar Pradesh.
