= Pravindra Kumar =

Indian biophysicist at IIT–Roorkee

- Born: India
- Education: Chaudhary Charan Singh University; All India Institute of Medical Sciences Delhi; Purdue University
- Known for: Studies on protein-protein interactions, protein engineering and structure-based drug design
- Awards: 2015 N-BIOS Prize
- Scientific career
- Fields: Biophysics; Bioinformatics; Biochemistry
- Workplaces: Indian Institute of Technology Roorkee

Professor Pravindra Kumar is an Indian biophysicist, bioinformatician, biochemist and Professor & Former Head Department of Biosciences and Bioengineering, Indian Institute Of Technology–Roorkee (IIT–Roorkee) India. He is known for his work on protein-protein interactions, protein engineering and structure-based drug design. Prof. Pravindra Kumar's primary research interest lies in studying Bacterial enzymes and pathways involved in the degradation of toxic aromatic compounds, such as PCBs, dibenzofuran, chlorodibenzofurans, DDT, dyes, and plastics/plasticizers. He focuses particularly on oxidoreductases enzymes due to their unique ability to catalyze challenging reactions, with a special emphasis on understanding their catalytic mechanisms and structural basis for guiding protein engineering. One notable achievement of his research group is the successful engineering of dioxygenases capable of metabolizing various toxic compounds, including those found in plastics (J. Bacteriol. 2016, BBRC 2012, JMB 2011, J.Biol. Chem. 2011).

== Biography ==
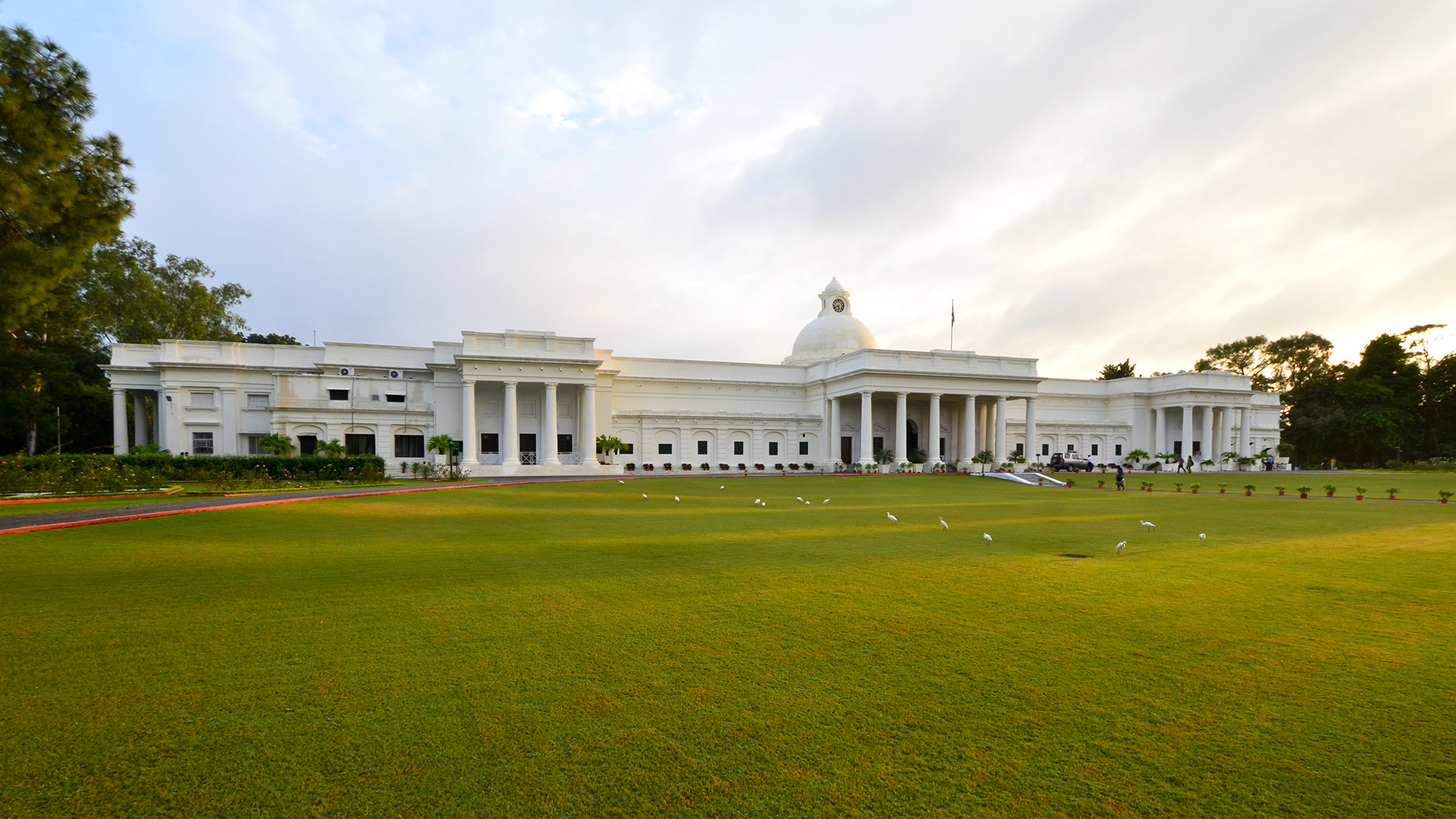
IIT Roorkee

The global surge in plastic consumption has led to the "Plastic Age," prompting his interest in finding innovative strategies for PET bioconversion and recycling through the engineering of robust enzymes and microbial strains. Toxic substances, such as phthalate and terephthalate, commonly found in plastic bottles, packaging, personal care items, and industrial waste, leading to their detection in various aquatic environments. These toxic substances cause cancer and heart diseases and have been found to disrupt the endocrine system and have adverse effects on reproductive health and physical growth. Hiss recent work has resulted in determining the first crystal structures of key enzymes involved in the degradation of phthalates and terephthalate, leading to the successful engineering of oxidoreductases with remarkable abilities to metabolize these toxic compounds (J. Biol. Chem., 2021; J. Bacteriol., 2021; Arch. of Biochem. and Biophys., 2022). Additionally, he has also developed a phthalate binding protein-based system for extracting phthalates from contaminated water. Prof. Kumar's lab has engineered potent microbial enzymes to eliminate these harmful substances from the atmosphere, potentially mitigating environmental contamination.This was helpful for the development of biological systems that convert waste plastic into valuable products, promoting a circular economy and reducing plastic waste's environmental impact. Further, his contributions extend to antimicrobial research, where he has made significant strides. Notably, he successfully determined the crystal structure of a crucial bacterial enzyme (OXA-58) and identified a novel inhibitor that shows promise in combating antibiotic resistance (Antimicrob Agents Chemother. 2015; Mol Biosys. 2016; JMB 2019). Moreover, his research efforts have identified potential drug targets in Moraxella catarrhalis, leading to the discovery of new inhibitors that could be utilized in developing novel antimicrobials (Acta Crystallogr D 2015; Biochim Biophys Acta. 2018; Biochemie. 2018; Arch. of Biochem. and Biophys., 2020; Biochemie. 2022). In addition to his antimicrobial research, Prof. Kumar's laboratory has explored the antibacterial properties of chlorogenic acid, a natural compound found in various plant species, as a potential new class of antibiotics (Sci. Rep. 2017; J. Bacteriol., 2020). Furthermore, his team has extensively studied the structural aspects of plant proteins and secondary metabolites from medicinal plants, leading to various discoveries with potential therapeutic implications (FEBS J 2012; PLoS One. 2013; Proteins; Proteomics 2015; Sci. Rep. 2017; Sci. Rep. 2020). Through collaboration, his team has discovered novel antivirals and patented an enzyme assay and kit for identifying inhibitors of alphavirus/Chikungunya virus (PLoS One 2013; J Virol. 2014; Sci Rep. 2017; Antiviral Res. 2017; Virology 2018; Virus Res. 2021; Virology 2022; FEBS J 2022). Prof. Pravindra Kumar's wide-ranging contributions to the understanding of enzymes, bacterial pathways, and potential drug targets have significant implications for both national and international issues. His research on plastics degradation can help address environmental pollution and promote sustainable practices in waste management. Additionally, his antimicrobial work offers promising solutions to combat antibiotic resistance and emerging viral threats, benefiting global public health efforts. Furthermore, his investigations into plant therapeutic proteins contribute to the advancement of medicinal sciences and the development of novel therapies for various ailments. Pravindra Kumar also focuses his interest on protein engineering and interactions as well as drug design and leads a team of researchers. In 2017, his team worked on Chlorogenic acid, an aromatic compound found naturally in plants like coffea and their biochemical and structural studies using x-ray crystallography techniques revealed that the compound had anti-bacterial properties. The discovery is reported to have opportunities in the development of a new class of antibiotics as the compound clings to the chorismate mutase enzyme in the shikimate pathway which assists in the synthesis of aromatic amino acids and this could inhibit the growth of bacteria. His studies have been documented by way of a number of articles (Note: Please see Selected bibliography section) and ResearchGate, an online repository of scientific articles has listed 117 of them.

== Awards and honors ==
- The Department of Biotechnology (DBT) of the Government of India awarded him the National Bioscience Award for Career Development, second highest prize after shanti swaroop Bhatnagar prize in 2015.
- Prof. Pravindra Kumar received a prestigious award as the chairperson from the Ashok Soota Foundation. Ashok Soota, Executive Chairman of Happiest Minds Technologies Limited, is widely recognized as one of the pioneering leaders of the Indian IT industry. As a serial entrepreneur, he has led both companies where he was founding Chairman to very successful IPOs: Happiest Minds (2020) and MindTree (2007).
- A Fellow, Biotech Research Society, India (BRSI) in 2021.
- ASM-IUSSTF INDO-US Visiting Professorship in 2017.
- IUSSTF Award for organizing Indo-US workshop and Symposium in 2014.
- BOYSCAST award from Department of Science and Technology, India and Visiting Scientist to USA in 2008.
- Visiting Scientist at Purdue University, USA from May - July 2006.
- National Bioscience Award by Department of Biotechnology (DBT), Ministry of Science & Technology, Govt. of India in 2016.
- S.V. TALEKAR MEDAL for Best Post Graduate Degree in AIIMS, DELHI in 2001.

== Selected bibliography ==
- Lonare, Santosh; Sharma, Manoj; Dalal, Vipin; Gubyad, Manisha; Kumar, Pankaj; Nath Gupta, Dilip; Pareek, Ashwani; Tomar, Shailly; Kumar Ghosh, Dipak; Kumar, Pradeep; Kumar Sharma, Alok (2023). "Identification and evaluation of potential inhibitor molecules against TcyA from Candidatus Liberibacter asiaticus". Journal of Structural Biology. 215 (3) 107992. doi:10.1016/j.jsb.2023.107992. PMID 37394197. S2CID 259314760.
- Mahto, Jai Krishna; Neetu, Neetu; Sharma, Monica; Dubey, Manish; Vellanki, Bhargava Pavan; Kumar, Pankaj (2022). "Structural insights into dihydroxylation of terephthalate, a product of polyethylene terephthalate degradation". Journal of Bacteriology. 204 (3): e0054321. doi:10.1128/JB.00543-21. PMC 8923216. PMID 35007143.
- Mahto, Jai Krishna; Sharma, Monica; Neetu, Neetu; Kayastha, Amritansh; Aggarwal, Shagun; Kumar, Pankaj (2022). "Conformational flexibility enables catalysis of phthalate cis-4,5-dihydrodiol dehydrogenase". Archives of Biochemistry and Biophysics. 727 109314. doi:10.1016/j.abb.2022.109314. PMID 35667443. S2CID 249353079.
- Rani, Rakhi; Long, Shou-Jiang; Pareek, Amit; Dhaka, Pradeep; Singh, Amit; Kumar, Pankaj; McInerney, Gerard; Tomar, Shailly (2022). "Multi-target direct-acting SARS-CoV-2 antivirals against the nucleotide-binding pockets of virus-specific proteins". Virology. 577: 77–86. doi:10.1016/j.virol.2021.12.007. PMID 35032866. S2CID 245485930.
- Dalal, Vipin; Golemi-Kotra, Dasantila; Kumar, Pankaj (2022). "Quantum mechanics/molecular mechanics studies on the catalytic mechanism of a novel esterase (FmtA) of Staphylococcus aureus". Journal of Chemical Information and Modeling. 62 (10): 2409–2420. doi:10.1021/acs.jcim.2c00057. PMID 35475370. S2CID 248404244.
- Katiki, Madhuri; Sharma, Monica; Neetu, Neetu; Rentala, Manohar; Kumar, Pankaj (2022). "Biophysical and modeling-based approach for the identification of inhibitors against DOHH from Leishmania donovani". Briefings in Functional Genomics. 22 (2): 217–226. doi:10.1093/bfgp/elab017. PMID 33758917.
- Singh, Vijay; Dhankhar, Pooja; Dalal, Vipin; Tomar, Shailly; Golemi-Kotra, Dasantila; Kumar, Pankaj (2022). "Drug-repurposing approach to combat Staphylococcus aureus: Biomolecular and binding interaction study". ACS Omega. 7 (43): 38448–38458. doi:10.1021/acsomega.2c06432. PMC 10034777. PMID 36969442. S2CID 257472622.
- Dhankhar, Pooja; Dalal, Vipin; Sharma, Alok K.; Kumar, Pankaj (2022). "Structural insights at acidic pH of Dye-decolorizing peroxidase from Bacillus subtilis". Proteins. 91 (4): 508–517. doi:10.1002/prot.26213. PMC 8673552. PMID 34387007.
- Dhankhar, Pooja; Dalal, Vipin; Singh, Vijay; Tomar, Shailly; Kumar, Pankaj (2022). "Computational guided identification of novel potent inhibitors of N-terminal domain of nucleocapsid protein of severe acute respiratory syndrome coronavirus 2". Journal of Biomolecular Structure and Dynamics. 40 (9): 4084–4099. doi:10.1080/07391102.2020.1852968. PMC 7754992. PMID 33251943.
- Singh, Vijay; Dhankhar, Pooja; Dalal, Vipin; Tomar, Shailly; Kumar, Pankaj (2022). "In-silico functional and structural annotation of hypothetical protein from Klebsiella pneumonia: A potential drug target". Journal of Molecular Graphics and Modelling. 116 108262. Bibcode:2022JMGM..116j8262S. doi:10.1016/j.jmgm.2022.108262. PMID 35839717. S2CID 250202477.

== See also ==
- Chikungunya
- Bacillus subtilis
