= PSOS (real-time operating system) =

pSOS
- Developer: Alfred Chao, Software Components Group (SCG); Integrated Systems Inc. (ISI); Wind River Systems
- Written in: 68000 assembly language
- Working state: Discontinued
- Source model: Closed source (original); Open source (later variants)
- Initial release: 1982; 44 years ago
- Latest release: Reliant (RoweBots) / August 2007; 18 years ago
- Marketing target: Embedded systems
- Available in: English
- Supported platforms: Motorola 68000 series
- Kernel type: Real-time monolithic
- License: Proprietary

pSOS (Portable Software On Silicon) is a real-time operating system (RTOS), created in about 1982 by Alfred Chao, and developed and marketed for the first part of its life by his company Software Components Group (SCG). In the 1980s, pSOS rapidly became the RTOS of choice for all embedded systems based on the Motorola 68000 series family architecture, because it was written in 68000 assembly language and was highly optimised from the start. It was also modularised, with early support for OS-aware debugging, plug-in device drivers, Internet protocol suite (TCP/IP) stacks, language libraries, and disk subsystems. Later came source code level debugging, multiprocessing support, and further computer networking extensions.

In about 1991, Software Components Group was acquired by Integrated Systems Inc. (ISI) which further developed pSOS, then renamed as pSOS+, for other microprocessor families, by rewriting most of it in the programming language C. Attention was also paid to supporting successively more integrated development environments, culminating in pRISM+.

In July 1994, ISI acquired Digital Research's modular real-time multi-tasking operating system FlexOS from Novell.

In 1995, ISI offered a pSOSystem/NEST package for Novell Embedded Systems Technology (NEST).

In February 2000, ISI was acquired by Wind River Systems, the originators of the rival RTOS VxWorks. Despite initial reports that pSOS support would continue, development was halted. Wind River announced plans for a 'convergence' version of VxWorks which will support pSOS system calls, and that no further releases of pSOS will occur.

NXP Semiconductors acquired pSOS for TriMedia from Wind River and continued to support this OS for the TriMedia very long instruction word (VLIW) core.

== Migration away from pSOS ==
In March 2000, rival company Express Logic released their Evacuation Kit for pSOS+ users, designed to provide a migration path to its ThreadX RTOS.

During August 2000, MapuSoft Technologies Inc. came up with the pSOS OS Changer porting kit which can smoothly move the software to multiple OS such as Linux, VxWorks, and more. It includes an integrated development environment (IDE) and application programming interface (API) optimization along with a profiling tool to measure API timing on target boards (www.mapusoft.com).

In August 2007, RoweBots, a former partner of SCG and ISI, open sourced their pSOS+ compatible version called Reliant. It is available to all that wish to upgrade without application changes.

The Xenomai project supports pSOS+ APIs (and others traditional RTOS APIs) over a Linux-based real-time framework to allow existing industrial applications to migrate easily to a Linux-based environment while keeping stringent real-time guarantees.

Another open sourced alternative is RTEMS, which has support for various APIs, including the "Classic API" (compatible to pSOS) and the POSIX API. Compared to Linux, RTEMS is a closer match to pSOS applications due to its lower memory size and its strict realtime behaviour.

Popular Secure Sockets Layer (SSL), now Transport Layer Security (TLS), libraries such as wolfSSL still support pSOS.

== See also ==
- FlexOS
- Novell Embedded Systems Technology (NEST)
- UNIX System V STREAMS
