= Himanshu Gupta =

Indian social entrepreneur

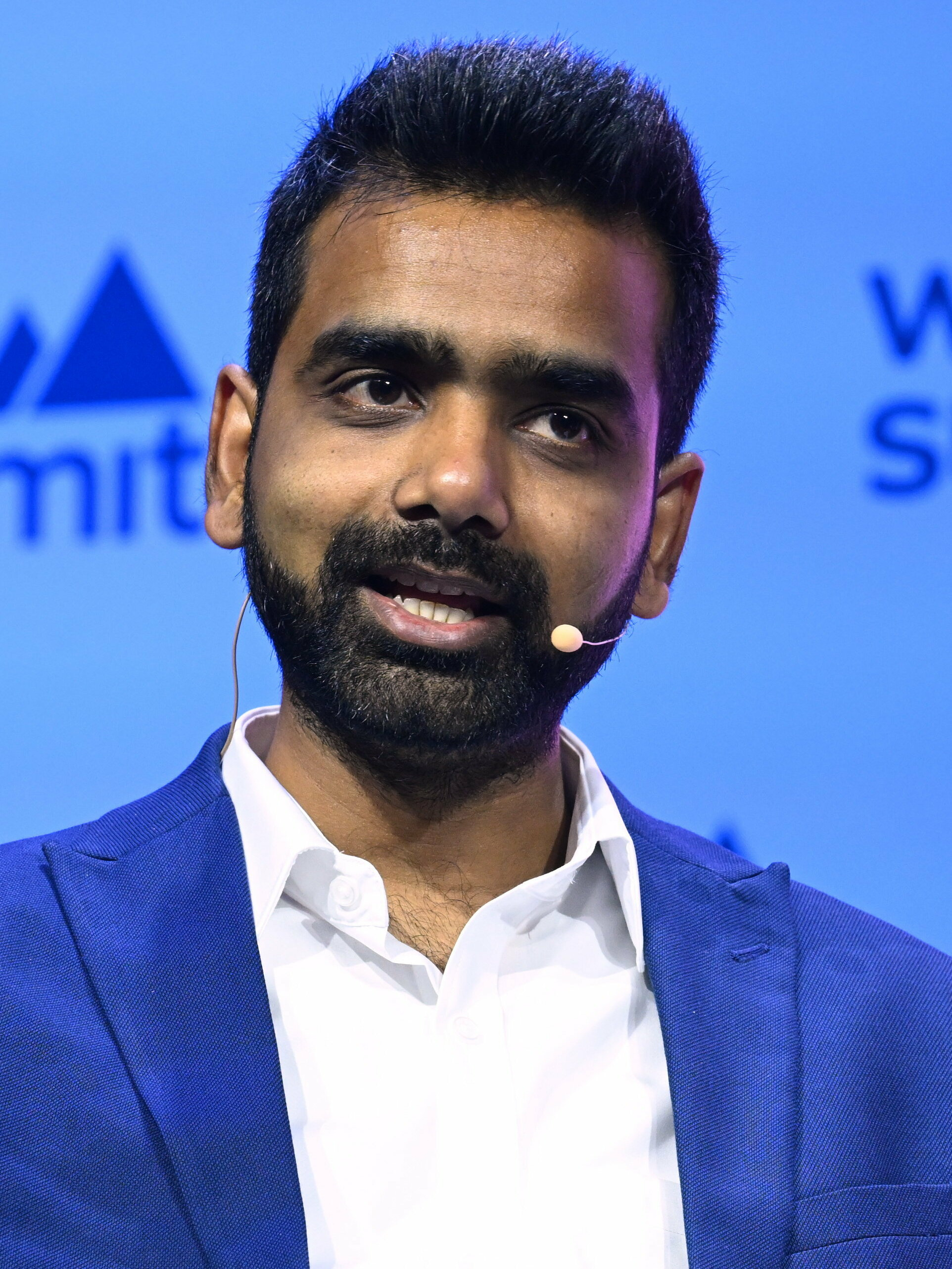
- Gupta in 2023
- Education: Stanford Graduate School of Business, Stanford University School of Engineering, Indian Institute of Technology Kharagpur
- Known for: Forbes 30 Under 30 India (2016); Energy policy of India
- Website: climate.ai (CEO/Co-founder)

Himanshu Gupta is an Indian American climate policy expert, engineer and entrepreneur. He is the co-founder and chief executive officer of ClimateAI, a climate adaptation technology company recognized by Time magazine as one of the best inventions in 2022. Gupta was elected as a Young Global Leader by the World Economic Forum and was awarded the UP Gaurav Samman, the highest civilian honor by his home state in India, presented jointly by the Vice President of India and Chief Minister Yogi Adityanath. Insider Magazine named him among the top 100 global leaders in AI. He is known for conceiving influential ideas in climate adaptation, such as adaptation credits and supply chain climate adaptation plans.

Gupta held roles from 2011 onwards for the Government of India in the energy sector, specializing in renewable and low carbon energy. In 2012, he drafted and created India's Renewable Energy Chapter in its National Five Year Plan, probably the youngest person to do so. In 2016, Himanshu was included in the prestigious Forbes 30 Under 30 India list for his work in energy and climate change space in India. He then went onto work with Al Gore as an expert on India's climate policy and co-authored a paper with Nicholas Stern and Montek Singh Ahluwalia on India's low carbon future. He then co-founded ClimateAI in 2017, which has currently raised $38 million and models the risk of climate change on supply chains. In 2023, he was named one of the top 100 people in Artificial Intelligence by Business Insider for his groundbreaking work on applying AI to climate adaptation solutions. Gupta was interviewed at World Economic Forum Davos on Applications of AI to food and water security and believes AI is a time and effectiveness multiplier for solutions to climate change.

== Early life and education ==
Gupta had a humble start in life; he was born and raised in Vrindavan, India. In interviews, he recalled the effects that droughts and monsoons had on his town while he was growing up. This played a major role in his involvement in climate action.

He studied in India and completed his undergraduate education in Electrical Engineering at the Indian Institute of Technology Kharagpur in 2009. He was a resident of Azad Hall and was actively involved in dramatics and technology societies.

== Career ==
=== Early career ===
Following on from his educational focus on electrical engineering, Gupta secured a role with AREVA T&D, which later became Alstom. It was a company in India that specialized in the manufacturing and installation of electrical substations and smart grids. In May 2011, Gupta took a sizeable pay cut to begin working for the Indian government, as the country increased its focus on clean energy. This began with India's creation of a National Clean Energy Fund in 2011, with him remaining in that role until 2013. His main role during this period was with the Indian Planning Commission, to oversee certain projects.

India's increased focus on clean energy and Gupta's role for the Planning Commission's renewable energy division meant his level of responsibility increased quickly. In 2012, he was tasked with drafting and creating the countries Renewable Energy Chapter in its twelfth National Five Year Plan. He also authored a second section of the five-year plan on research & development for India's energy sector. This work on the National Five Year Plan made him the youngest lead. His work with the Government of India continued into 2014, where he was the project leader for the India Energy Security Scenarios 2047 report, under the guidance of Montek Singh Ahluwalia. The year 2047 is seen as symbolic for India, as it is the year it will celebrate 100 years of independence. As part of the work on India's policy on energy security, Gupta organised both multilateral and bilateral dialogues with US Department of Energy and the UK Department of Energy and Climate Change.

=== ClimateAI ===
In 2015, Gupta joined the Grantham Research Institute on Climate Change and the Environment to work with Lord Nicholas Stern on a research paper for India's transition to low carbon energy. A number of conclusions were drawn from the paper, including that India needed to reduce its energy intensity in order to meet global targets to keep the Earth below a 2 °C temperature rise. Gupta also studied the importance of energy pricing and how it could impact on the speed of adoption of greener technology and fuels. Around the same period, Gupta co-founded the NGO, Sustainable Growth Initiative (SGI), to help businesses and governments reduce their carbon footprints and increase energy security. His work with SGI and his business partner Shrey Goyal led to him featuring in Forbes India's 30 Under 30 list in 2016.

Gupta then moved to Stanford University in 2015 to study his MBA. Gupta worked with Al Gore for a short period during the same year as an expert on India's energy and climate policy. While at Stanford, he met Max Evans and together they co-founded ClimateAI in July 2017. ClimateAI's seed funding was partly provided by Stanford University, along with other backers including professors at Stanford.

ClimateAI secured $12 million in its Series A funding round in July 2021. In 2022, Gupta's ClimateAI was recognized as one of Time magazine's best inventions of 2022. At the time of the award, the predictor focused on food and agriculture supply chains, predicting average temperatures, extreme weather and water availability. Time predicted that future uses for the predictor could include flooding risk for developers. The company is now working with many known brands such as Driscoll's, Oceanspray, Nuveen Natural Capital, UPL among other market leaders.

At Davos World Economic Forum in 2022, Gupta spoke about the difficulty of getting new seeds to market for farmers. He stated that often new seeds that had a higher tolerance to drought for example, could take up to 15 years to enter local markets. With the speed of the change in climate, often seeds would prove to be less effective than initially planned, purely due to the lead time of the process. The artificial intelligence deployed by ClimateAI allows for specific seeds to be chosen based on weather and soil data within hours, instead of lengthy trials often taking years.

== Key contributions ==
=== Climate-tech education ===
In 2020, Himanshu published an adaptation and mitigation framework for analyzing climate-tech companies, establishing ClimateAi's unique positioning and helping investors improve their understanding of the market. He has also spoken about the need to use climate-sharpe ratios to quantify climate change related risk and volatility and conceptualized unique funding mechanisms (e.g. adaptation credit) to fund climate-tech adaptation in vulnerable countries

=== Food security ===
Himanshu has spoken about impact of climate change on wine, cranberries, sweet potatoes, turkeys, bread, wheat, potatoes, and soybeans. He has also spoken about Supply Chain Climate Action Plans(S-CAPs) to protect vulnerable food supply chains from climate impacts.

In 2022, Himanshu shared his opinion on food security at the Davos World Economic Forum.

=== Artificial intelligence ===
Himanshu has spoken about importance of artificial intelligence to achieve breakthrough results for climate change mitigation, ESG, climate related supply-chain forecasting, and agriculture.
