= Desh Bandhu Gupta =

Indian billionaire, philanthropist, entrepreneur

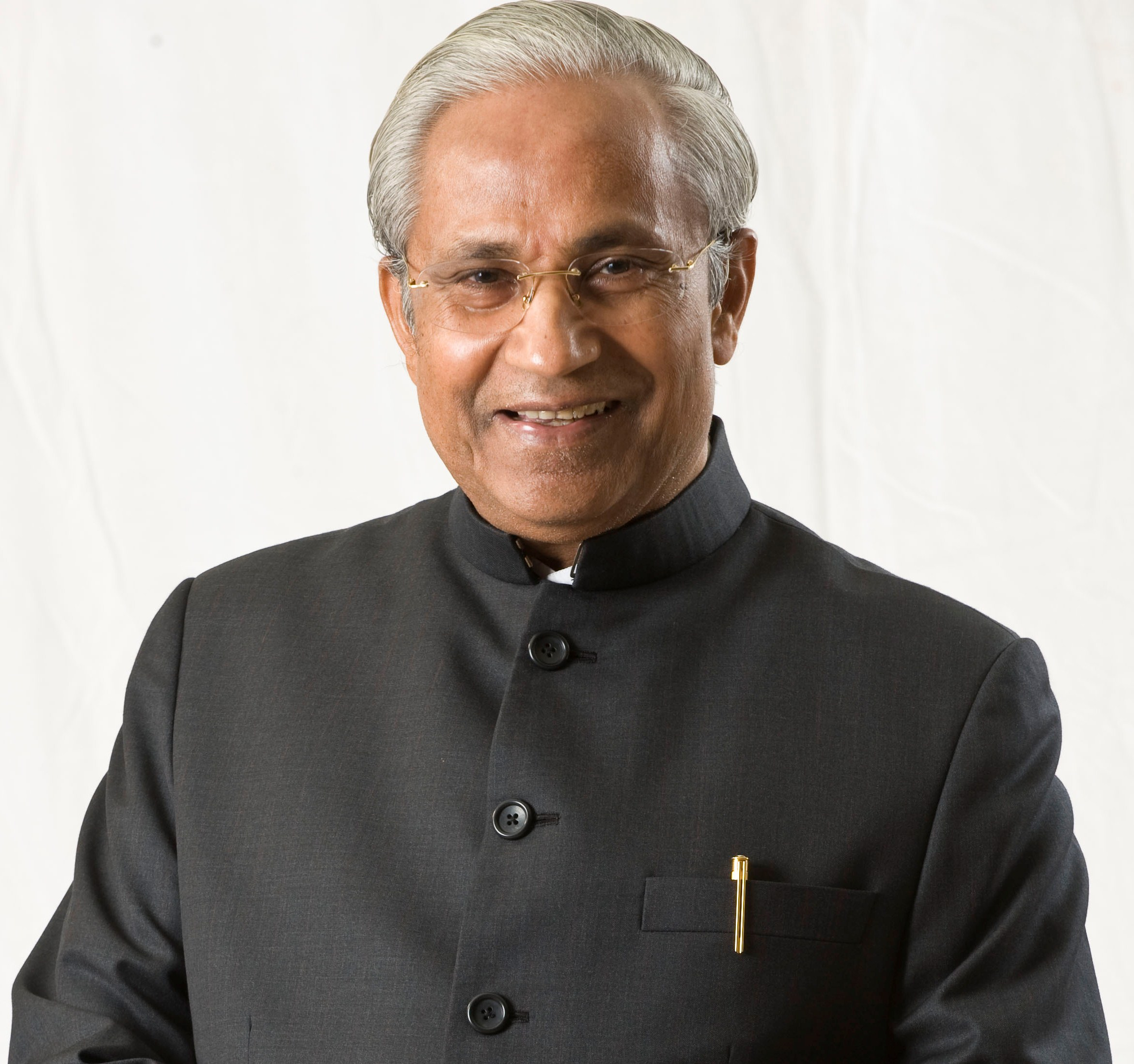
- Born: 8 February 1938; Rajgarh, Alwar, Alwar State, British Raj (now in Rajasthan, India)
- Died: 26 June 2017 (aged 79); Mumbai, India
- Education: Bombay University
- Occupation: Businessman
- Known for: Founder and chairman, Lupin Limited
- Children: 5, including Vinita D. Gupta and Nilesh Gupta

Desh Bandhu Gupta (8 February 1938 – 26 June 2017) was an Indian billionaire, philanthropist, entrepreneur and the founder of Lupin Limited, a multinational pharmaceutical company. At the time of his death, his net worth was estimated at US$3.6 billion.

== Early life ==
Gupta was born on 8 February 1938 in Rajgarh, Alwar, Rajasthan. He was the eldest of the five siblings. He earned a master's degree in chemistry from Bombay University.

== Career ==
Gupta started his career as an associate professor at the Birla Institute of Technology and Science, Pilani, Rajasthan. He quit teaching and decided to be an entrepreneur as he was "not able to implement ideas into practice". He moved to Bombay (now Mumbai) and worked in a small British pharmaceutical manufacturing company.

He founded Lupin in 1968 with a start-up capital of ₹ 5000 borrowing the money from his wife. The first office of Lupin was rented premises in Central Mumbai used for dispatching medicines. Later, with a loan of ₹ 8 lakh from Central Bank of India, he started a factory whose major order was to provide iron and folic acid tablets to the Government of India programmes related to mother and child healthcare. Under his leadership, Lupin became a global pharmaceutical company by entering markets across the globe including US and Japan.

Gupta set up the Lupin Human Welfare & Research Foundation (LHWRF) in October 1988. LHWRF was set up with the objective of creating a reproducible and evolving model for sustainable rural development with a simple goal of uplifting families living below the poverty line in rural India. This vision of rural development focuses on holistic development programs that systematically create opportunities and infrastructure, while empowering people in rural areas, to bring about a socio-economic change and ensure the inclusion of rural communities in the nation's economic progress. Nationally, the Lupin Foundation impacts the lives of 2.8 million people living in about 3,500 villages spread across 9 states – Rajasthan, Maharashtra, Madhya Pradesh, Goa, Uttarakhand, Gujarat, Jammu, Andhra Pradesh, and Sikkim.

Gupta was the recipient of an Ernst & Young Entrepreneur of the Year Award for 2011 in the healthcare sector, and a Frost & Sullivan Lifetime Achievement Award in 2013. In April 2018, he was posthumously inducted into the Hall of Fame at the CNBC TV18 India Business Leader Awards 2018.

In 2015, Forbes estimated Gupta's net worth at $7.2 billion, making him the 254th richest person in the world.

== Personal life ==
Gupta was married to Manju and lived in Mumbai. He is survived by his wife and five children: four daughters and one son. Their daughter Vinita D. Gupta is based in United States and is the Group President & CEO and son Nilesh Gupta is the Managing Director based in India.

Gupta died on 26 June 2017 at Mumbai, aged 79.
