= Vinita D. Gupta =

Indian businesswoman

- Born: 1968 or 1969 (age 56–57)
- Education: University of Mumbai; Kellogg School of Management
- Occupation: Businesswoman
- Title: CEO, Lupin Limited
- Term: September 2013-
- Board member of: Lupin Limited; Intrexon
- Spouse: Brij Sharma
- Children: 1
- Parent: Desh Bandhu Gupta
- Relatives: Nilesh Gupta (brother)

Vinita D. Gupta (born 1968 or 1969) is an Indian businesswoman, the chief executive officer (CEO) of Lupin Limited since September 2013, and the chairperson of Lupin Inc (LI), and its US subsidiary, Lupin Pharmaceuticals Inc (LPI).

== Early life ==
Vinita D. Gupta is the eldest daughter of Desh Bandhu Gupta, who founded Lupin in 1968.

She earned a bachelor's degree in pharmacy from the University of Mumbai, and an MBA from the Kellogg School of Management, US.

== Career ==
Gupta joined Lupin in 1993, and became CEO in 2013.

Gupta was the chairman and CEO of Lupin Pharmaceuticals Inc, from 2003 to 2013, and grew the US business from 5% to over 45% of Lupin's total turnover.

The US is Lupin's largest market. Lupin's estimated annual cost savings to the US health system is approximately $15 billion. In March 2016, the company acquired Gavis Pharmaceuticals in Somerset, NJ for $880 million. Lupin has invested over $1 billion for the US market in 2016. Lupin employs 674 employees in the US.

In April 2017, Gupta was appointed a non-executive director of Intrexon.

Gupta and her brother Nilesh Gupta, managing director of Lupin Limited, were jointly named Ernst & Young Entrepreneur of The Year for India 2015, and won the Forbes India Leadership Awards 2016 – Entrepreneur of the Year. She was the winner of the inaugural EY, U.S. 2012 Family Business Award of Excellence and EY Entrepreneur Of The Year 2012 award winner for the Health Services and Technology for Maryland. She was named by Forbes Asia in its Top 50 power businesswomen for Asia Pacific in 2014. She entered the Hall of Fame – Most Powerful Women in Business 2016 – Business Today and was named Outstanding Business Woman Leader of the Year - 11th CNBC India Business Leader Awards.

== Personal life ==
She is married to Brij Sharma, a US-based millionaire investor and entrepreneur, they have a son named Krish Sharma, and live in Florida, US.
