= Vinita Gupta =

American businessman (born 1950)

- Born: 1950 (age 75–76); Delhi, India
- Education: Indian Institute of Technology Roorkee, University of California Los Angeles
- Occupations: Founder and chairman of Quick Eagle Networks
- Known for: First woman of Indian origin to take her company public in the US
- Board member of: Palo Alto Medical Foundation, Indian School of Business and Cancer Prevention Institute of California
- Spouse: Narendra K. Gupta
- Children: 2
- Website: www.guptavinita.com

Vinita Gupta (born 1950) is an Indian-born American businesswoman. She is the founder and chairman of Digital Link Corporation (now Quick Eagle Networks). She is credited with being the first woman of Indian origin to take her company public in the United States.

== Early life ==
Gupta was born in 1950 in India and spent her early years in Delhi. In 1973 she earned a bachelor's degree in electronics and communications from the University of Roorkee (now Indian Institute of Technology Roorkee). In 1974 she came to the United States and earned an M.S. in electrical engineering from University of California Los Angeles.

== Career ==
In her early career, Gupta worked as an engineer for GTE Lenkurt and later held engineering management positions at Bell Northern Research (now part of Nortel Networks).

In May 1985 Gupta founded Digital Link Corporation, a company which engaged in the design, manufacture, marketing, and support of digital wide area network access products for global networks. The company went public in 1994 and was later renamed as Quick Eagle Networks. Gupta is still chairman, chief executive officer and president.

Gupta is chairman of Palo Alto Medical Foundation Research Institute. She is on the board of Indian School of Business (ISB), Hyderabad and Cancer Prevention Institute of California.

Gupta holds two US patents, one for a solid state relay issued in 1984 and another for a square root circuit issued in 1986.

== Honors ==
For two consecutive years, Working Woman Magazine has named Digital Link one of the top 500 women-owned businesses in the United States. She was the 1999 honoree at Asian Pacific Fund.

== Personal life ==
Gupta was married to Narendra K. Gupta, vice chairman and interim president and CEO of Wind River Systems, and co-founder of Integrated Systems Inc. until his death on 25 December 2021. Gupta has two daughters.
