= Prakash Kumar Singh =

Indian Businessman

Prakash Kumar Singh is the Chairman of Steel Authority of India Limited, SAIL, one of the largest state-owned steel-making companies based in India and one of the major steel makers in the world.

== Career ==
P K Singh obtained his degree in metallurgy from Indian Institute of Technology Roorkee. Singh joined SAIL, Bokaro Steel Plant in 1980.

Singh was general manager (Blast Furnace) at Bokaro Steel Plant before being appointed executive director at IISCO Steel Plant.

Singh was executive director (Works) at Bhilai Steel Plant and prior to that he was executive director (Works) at IISCO Steel Plant. Before taking charge as chairman, SAIL in December 2015, Singh was the chief executive officer of SAIL's Durgapur Steel Plant and in July, 2015, he was also given the additional charge of CEO, IISCO Steel Plant.

== Awards and recognition ==
He has been conferred with various awards viz. ‘Jawahar’ award for outstanding performance at ISP, Burnpur. ‘Industry Leader’ award conferred by Central Mechanical Engineering Research Institute, ‘Industry Leadership’ award conferred by the Institution of Engineers, Durgapur, ‘Best CEO’ award for the Eastern region conferred by the Quality Circle Forum of India, Durgapur Chapter.
