= Havells =

Indian electrical equipment manufacturer

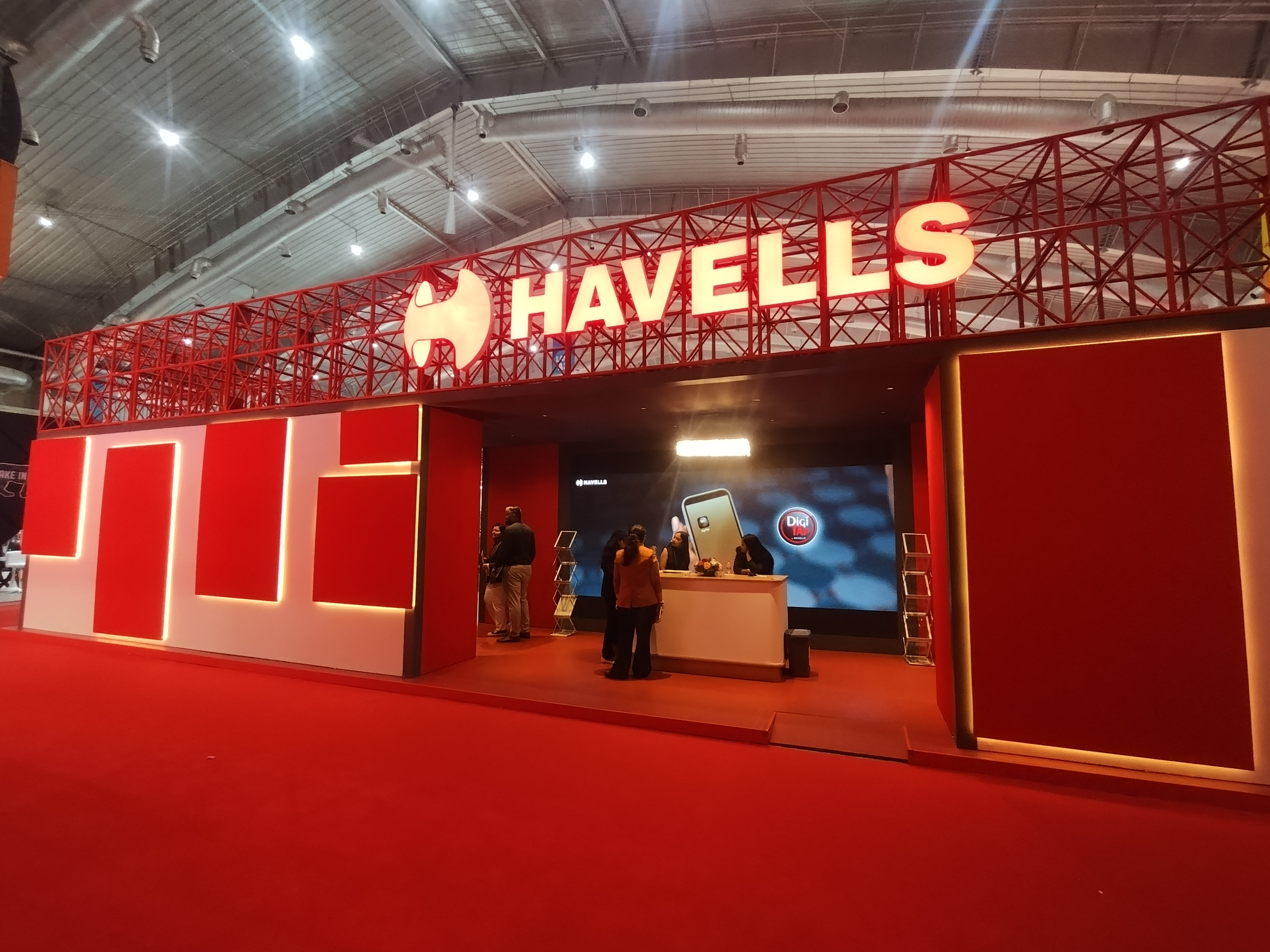
- Havells at Acetech 2025, BIEC
- Type: Public
- Traded as: BSE: 517354; NSE: HAVELLS
- ISIN: INE176B01034
- Industry: Electrical equipment; Home appliances
- Founded: 1958; 68 years ago
- Founder: Qimat Rai Gupta
- Headquarters: Noida, Uttar Pradesh, India
- Area served: Worldwide
- Key people: Anil Rai Gupta (Chairman & MD)
- Products: LV Motors; Home applications; Kitchen appliances; Lighting; Consumer and industrial switchgear; Cables and wires; Electrical equipment
- Brands: Lloyd
- Revenue: ▲₹21,746 crore (US$2.3 billion) (2025)
- Operating income: ▲₹2,149 crore (US$220 million) (2025)
- Net income: ▲₹1,489 crore (US$150 million) (2025)
- Number of employees: 5,781 (2020)
- Website: www.havells.com
- Footnotes; Financials as of 31 March 2025.

Havells India Limited is an Indian multinational electrical equipment company, based in Noida. The company manufactures home appliances, lighting for domestic, commercial and industrial applications, LED lighting, fans, modular switches and wiring accessories, water heaters, industrial and domestic circuit protection switchgear, industrial and domestic cables and wires, induction motors, and capacitors among others. Havells owns brands like Havells, Lloyd, Crabtree, Standard Electric, Reo and Promptec.

The company has 23 branches or representative offices with over 6,000 workers in over 50 countries. As of 2016, it has 11 manufacturing plants in India located at Haridwar, Baddi, Noida, Faridabad, Alwar, Neemrana, and Bengaluru.

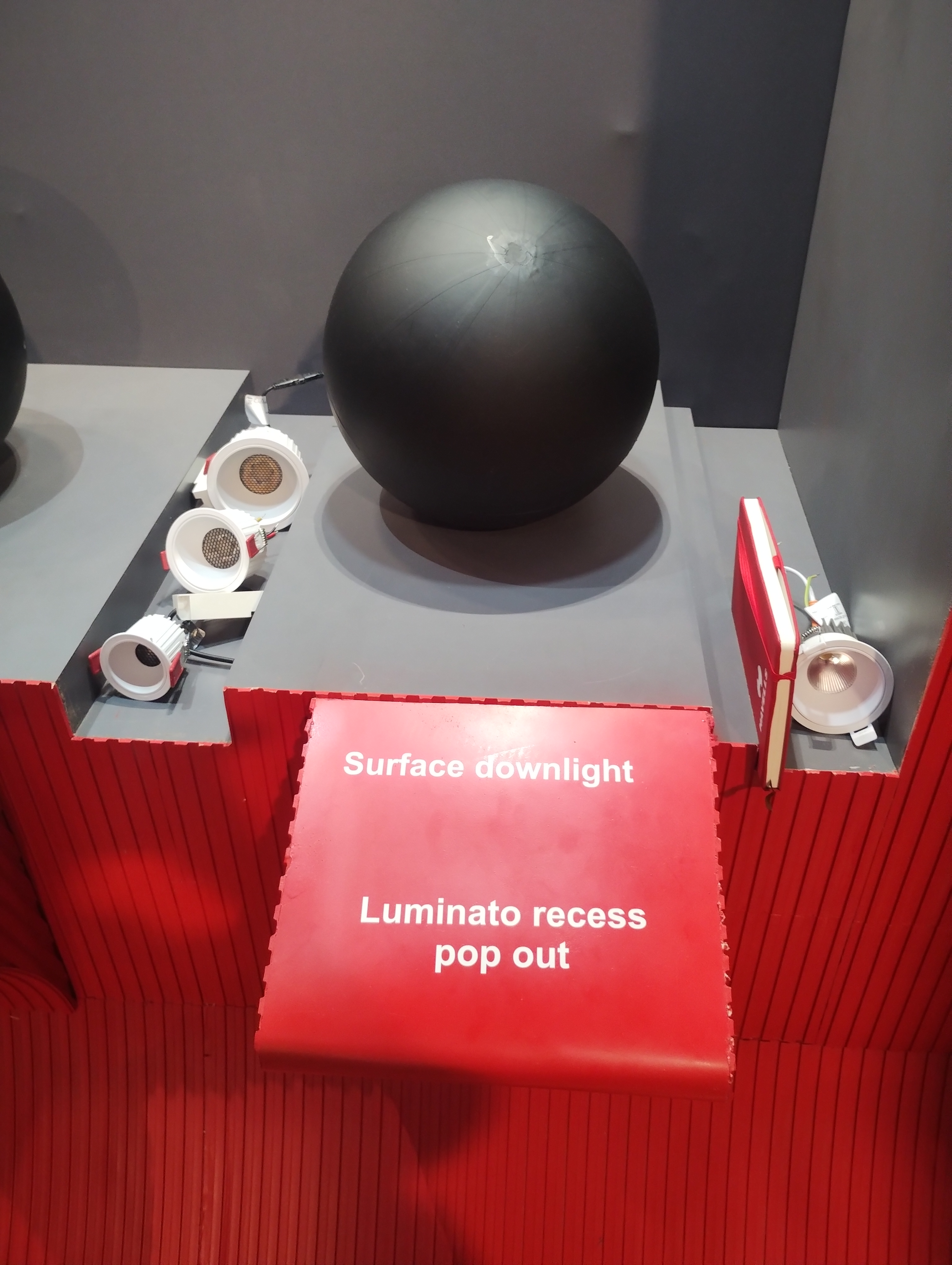
Havells surface downlight display at Acetech 2025, BIEC

== History ==
In 1958, Qimat Rai Gupta moved from Malerkotla to Old Delhi, where he set up an electrical equipment trading shop. In 1971, Haveli Ram Gandhi sold his switchgear company–Havells–to Gupta, who was his distributor at the time. The company subsequently entered other product segments such as cables, lightings, appliances, fans and geysers.

In 1983, it bought the loss-making Delhi-based Towers and Transformers Ltd and turned it around in a year. Between 1997 and 2001, Havells also bought ECS, Duke Arnics Electronics, Standard Electricals and Crabtree India. There was a 50:50 joint venture between Havells and the UK-based Crabtree, and Havells later acquired Crabtree's stake in the JV. In 2007, Havells acquired European lighting company Sylvania for about €200 million. In 2010, Havells introduced ceramic metal-halide lamp.

In April 2015, Havells acquired a 51% majority stake in Promptec Renewable before increasing its stake in the company to 100% in 2018. In December 2015, Havells sold 80% stake in Sylvania Malta and Havells Exim Hong Kong to Shanghai Feilo Acoustics for ₹1,070 crore (US$166.79 million) and sold the remaining 20% two years later. In February 2017, it acquired the consumer durables business of Lloyd Electricals at an enterprise value of ₹1,600 crore (US$245.69 million).
