= Janet Pancho Gupta =

Filipino photographer (born 1976)

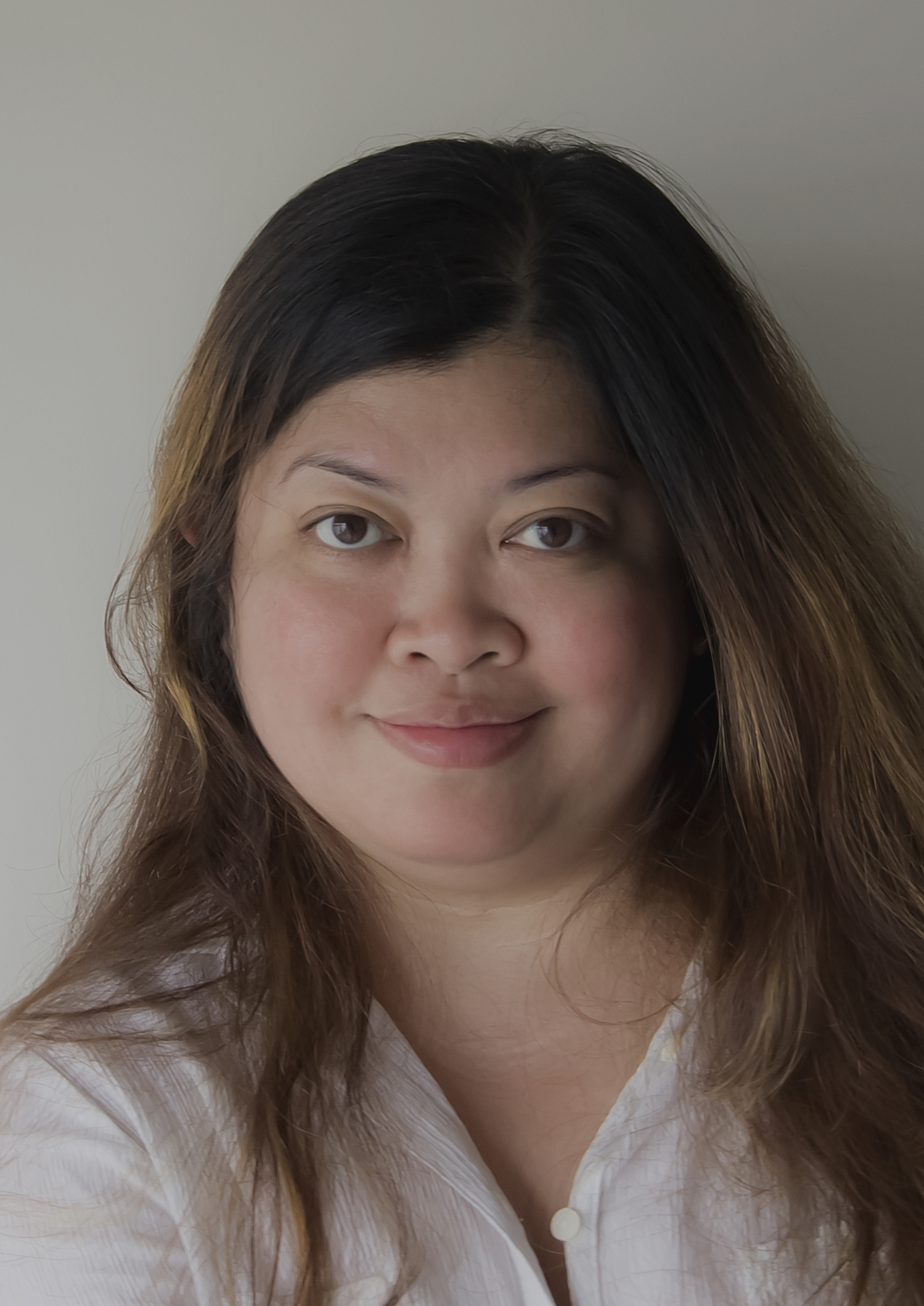
- Born: November 3, 1976 (age 48); Mabinay, Negros Oriental, Philippines
- Website: http://www.janetpanchoguptafineart.com/

Janet Pancho Gupta is an artist and photographer. Gupta was born and raised in Philippines and is based in Hong Kong.

== Biography ==
Gupta was born in Mabinay, Negros Oriental, Philippines. The artist and former domestic helper came to Hong Kong from the Philippines in 2000.

== Paintings ==
As a painter, Gupta is known to create bold, detailed watercolor works and intense portraits that draw the viewer to the expressions.

Gupta began to paint nature as it was the aspect that she missed the most from her childhood as she was constantly surrounded by it in her hometown back in the Philippines. Gupta's recent "pixelated" artworks highlight her feelings of being enclosed in the small spaces of Hong Kong.

== Photography ==
Artist Janet Pancho Gupta mixes colourful, up-close images with stark black and whites of city life in Hong Kong.

Gupta calls her work a transformation and not a transition because both painting and photography become a perfect marriage in her creativity. Gupta's photographs capture the daily life in the city, the busy urban landscape and nature in the New Territories.

== Exhibitions ==
- 2017 Asian Contemporary Art, Singapore
- 2016 Symphony Of Life, Solo Exhibition Art Show, Philippine Consulate General, Hong Kong (Watercolor Paintings)
- 2016 Finding Face, Solo Exhibition, Culture Club Gallery, Soho Central (Street & Nature Photography)
- 2014 Group Exhibition, Prince Marco Polo Hotel, Tsim Tsa Tsui, Hong Kong
- 2014 Group Exhibition, Visual Art Centre, Hong Kong
- 2013 Charity Auction, Helena May, Central
- 2012 Hong Kong Contemporary, Presented by Moon Gallery, The Excelsior Hotel, Hong Kong
- 2012 Hong Kong Gardening Society, YMCA, T.S.T. Hong Kong
- 2008 Colours And Faces Of Life, Solo Exhibition, Culture Club Gallery, Soho, Hong Kong.
