= Qimat Rai Gupta =

Indian entrepreneur, founder, former chairman and managing director of Havells

Qimat Rai Gupta (also known as Q R Gupta and QRG) was an Indian entrepreneur, founder, former chairman and managing director of Havells, a global electrical company. Gupta was among the 100 richest Indians, and on Forbes list of global billionaires.

== Early life ==
Gupta was born in 1937 in Malerkotla, Punjab, British India (present-day Punjab, India). In 1958, he quit his studies in Punjab and moved to New Delhi, where he started an electrical trading shop called Guptaji & Company in Bhagirath Place, an electrical wholesale market in Delhi, with a capital of ₹10,000.

== Havells ==
In 1971, Gupta purchased existing company Havells brand name from Haveli Ram Gandhi for ₹700,000. As of 2015, Havells is among the top five lighting brands in the world with market cap of above US$10 billion.

== Healthcare ==
Gupta started QRG Central Hospital and multi-specialty healthcare facility QRG Health City in Faridabad.

== Awards ==
- EY Entrepreneur Of The Year Award 2013

== Family ==
Qimat Gupta was married to Vinod and had two sons and one daughter. Only his second son Anil Rai Gupta is part of the business, and succeeded his father as Havells' Chairman. Gupta died at the age of 77 due to cardiac arrest on 7 November 2014.
