= Anil Rai Gupta =

Indian Billionaire businessman (born 1969)

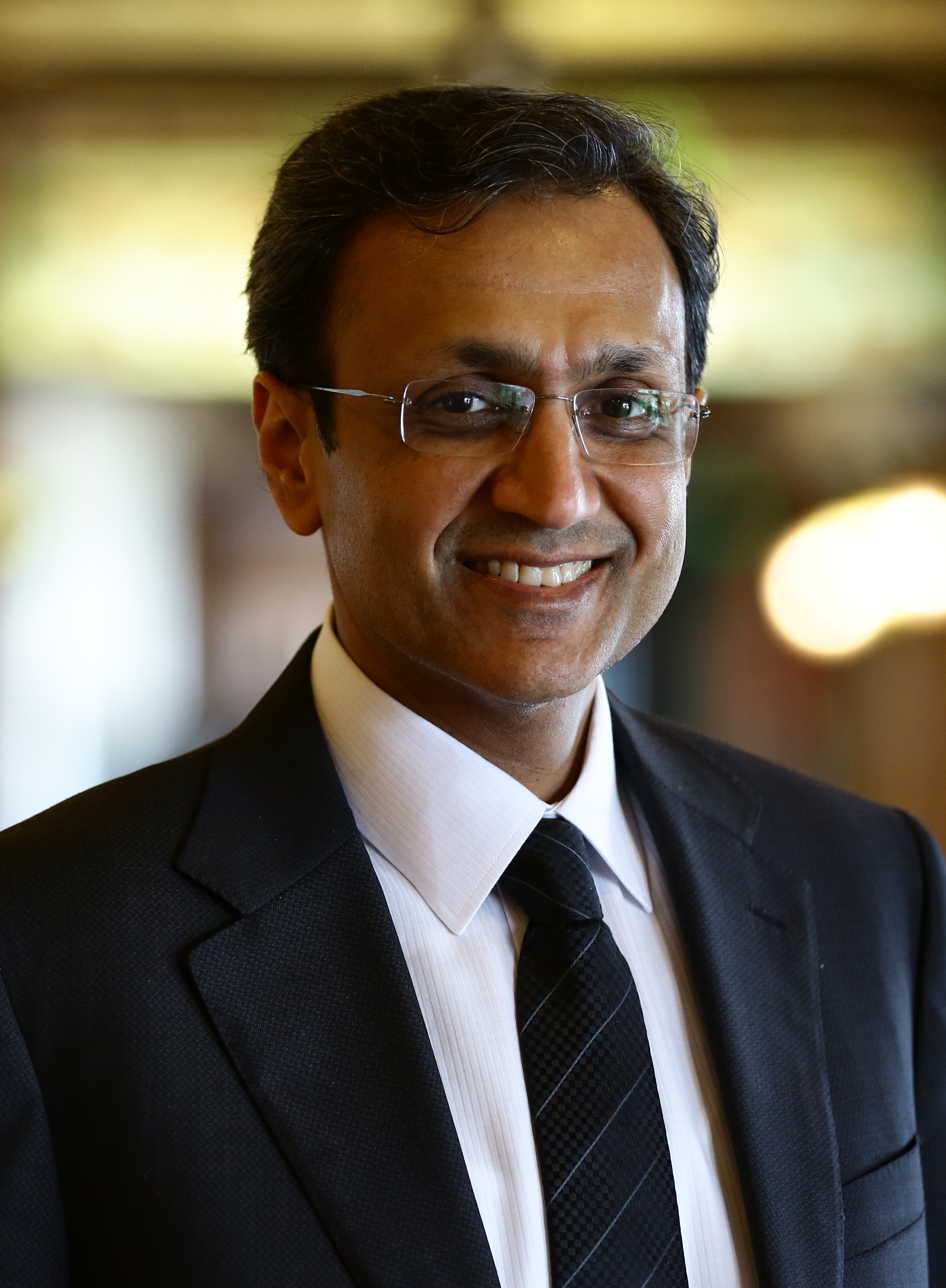
- Born: Anil Rai Gupta; 20 April 1969 (age 57); Delhi, India
- Education: University of Delhi; Wake Forest University
- Occupations: Chair and managing director of havells
- Spouse: Sangeeta Gupta
- Children: Aradhana Rai Gupta
- Parents: Qimat Rai Gupta (father); Vinod Gupta (mother)

Anil Rai Gupta (born 20 April 1969) is an Indian businessman. He is the chair and managing director of Havells India. In October 2024, Vinod and Anil Rai Gupta and their families were ranked 27th on the Forbes list of India’s 100 richest tycoons, with a net worth of $9.5 billion.

== Early life and education ==
Gupta was born on 20 April 1969 in Delhi. His father Qimat Rai Gupta was the founder of Havells.

Gupta attended St. Xavier's School in Delhi. He obtained a bachelor's degree in economics from Sriram College of Commerce, and an MBA from Wake Forest University, North Carolina.

== Business career ==
Gupta joined his father's company in 1992 as a non-executive director. He led Havells' acquisition of the European lighting company Sylvania and its restructuring as Havells Sylvania.

After his father's death in November 2014, Gupta succeeded him the chairman and managing director of Havells. He has focused on expanding the company's range of electrical consumer durables and improving its brand recognition.

== Other activities and recognition ==
Gupta is one of the founders of Ashoka University, a private liberal arts college in Haryana. He wrote a biography of his father, Havells: The Untold Story of Qimat Rai Gupta (2016), which was well received.

Gupta was awarded an Honorary Doctorate by his alma mater Wake Forest University in 2017. and the All India Management Association's Emerging Business Leader (2017). In FY 17–18 Anil Rai Gupta has also been honoured with ET Family Business of the year. Anil has also been named as "Entrepreneur for the year 2019" Forbes India Forbes India Leadership Award. He has been bestowed Business Today Best CEO in Consumer Durabale Category consecutively for 2019 and 2020.

== Personal life ==
Gupta is married to Sangeeta Rai Gupta. They have two children.
