= Lupin (company) =

Indian multinational pharmaceutical company

Lupin Limited
- Type: Public
- Traded as: BSE: 500257; NSE: LUPIN
- Industry: Pharmaceuticals
- Founded: 1968; 58 years ago
- Founder: Desh Bandhu Gupta
- Headquarters: Mumbai, Maharashtra, India
- Key people: Vinita D. Gupta (CEO); Nilesh Gupta (MD)
- Products: Pharmaceutical drugs; generic drugs; antiviral drugs; over-the-counter drugs; vaccines; diagnostics; contact lenses; animal health; dietary supplements
- Revenue: ▲₹22,192 crore (US$2.3 billion) (2025)
- Operating income: ▲₹5,277 crore (US$550 million) (2025)
- Net income: ▲₹3,281 crore (US$340 million) (2025)
- Total assets: ▲₹29,204 crore (US$3.0 billion) (2025)
- Total equity: ▲₹17,294 crore (US$1.8 billion) (2025)
- Number of employees: 20,000+ (2023)
- Website: www.lupin.com
- Footnotes; Financials as of 31 March 2025.

Lupin Limited is an Indian multinational pharmaceutical company based in Mumbai. It is primarily a manufacturer of generic drugs, covering therapeutic areas such as paediatrics, cardiovascular, anti-infectives, diabetology, asthma and anti-tuberculosis.The company operates in multiple international markets including the United States, Japan, Europe, and Australia..

== History ==
Lupin was founded in 1968 by Desh Bandhu Gupta, who was a professor of chemistry at BITS-Pilani, Rajasthan. Gupta initially borrowed Rs. 5000 from his wife to fund the venture. Due to subsequent funding from the Central Bank of India, the company able to start their manufacturing facility for producing folic acid and iron tablets for the Indian government's mother and child health program. Later Lupin started manufacturing anti-tuberculosis (TB) drugs which at one point formed 36% of the company sales and was considered as the largest TB drugs manufacturer in the world.

In 1988 Gupta founded the group's CSR arm, the Lupin Human Welfare & Research Foundation (LHWRF). This initiative was dedicated to sustainable rural development with the aim to uplift families living below the poverty line.

In 1999, Lupin joined the Indian Pharmaceutical Alliance as a founding member.

In July 2015 the company announced its intention to acquire Gavis Pharmaceuticals and Novel Laboratories for $880 million.

The founder, Desh Bandhu Gupta died in June 2017 and was subsequently replaced as chairman by his wife, Manju Deshbandhu Gupta.

In October 2019, Lupin announced the Appointment of Sreeji Gopinatham as Chief Information Officer (CIO).

In March 2019, the US FDA put several Lupin drug plants on notice for quality problems, and indicated it might not approve future Lupin drug applications.

In May 2023, Lupin entered into an agreement to buy the French pharmaceutical company Medisol.

== Businesses ==
Lupin's businesses encompass the entire pharmaceutical value chain, ranging from branded and generic formulations, APIs, advanced drug delivery systems to biotechnology. The company's drugs reach 70 countries with a footprint that covers advanced markets such as USA, Europe, Japan, Australia as well as emerging markets including India, the Philippines and South Africa.

=== United States ===
Headquartered in Baltimore, Maryland, Lupin Pharmaceuticals Inc. (LPI), the company's US subsidiary is a $891 million enterprise. It has a presence in the branded and generics markets of the US. In the branded business, Lupin operates in the CVS and Pediatric segments. The company is the market leader in 28 products out of the 77 products marketed in the US generics market, of which it is amongst the Top 3 by market share in 57 of these products (IMS Health, December 2014): Suprax (Cefixime), a paediatric antibiotic, is Lupin's top-selling product here. Other products in Lupin's branded portfolio include Antara (Fenofibrate), Locoid lotion, Alinia (Nitazoxanide) and InspiraChambers (Anti-static valved holding chamber). The company is also the 5th largest and fastest growing generics player in the US (5.3% market share by prescriptions, IMS Health). Lupin's US brands business contributed 9% of total US sales whereas the generics business contributed 91% during FY 2014–15.

=== India Region Formulations (IRF) ===
Lupin's IRF business focuses on Lifestyle diseases and Chronic disease therapy segments, particularly in Cardiology, Central Nervous System (CNS), Diabetology, Anti-Asthma, Anti-Infective, Gastro Intestinal and Oncology. The IRF business contributed 24% of the company's overall revenues for FY 2014–15, growing by 20% and recording revenues of ₹29,676 million (US$310 million) for FY 2014-15 as compared to ₹24,794 million (US$260 million) for FY 2013–14.

It has 12 manufacturing plants and 2 Research plants in India, as Jammu(J&K), Mandideep & Indore (Madhya pradesh), Ankaleswar & Dabasa (Gujarat), Tarapur, Aurangabad and Nagpur (Maharashtra), Goa, Visakhapatnam (Andhra Pradesh) and Sikkim; where research centre at Pune and Aurangabad. Among these the baby plant is Nagpur plant which will the biggest formulation unit for Lupin in coming year.

=== Japan ===
Lupin operates in Japan through its subsidiary, Kyowa Pharmaceutical Industry Co. Ltd. (Kyowa), a company acquired in 2007, and I’rom, Pharmaceutical Co. Ltd (IP), acquired in 2011.

In 2014, Lupin entered into a strategic joint venture agreement with Toyama-based Japanese pharmaceuticals company, Yoshindo Inc. to create YL Biologics (YLB).

In 2019, Lupin exited the generic pharmaceuticals business in Japan by divesting its stake in Kyowa to private equity firm Unison for an enterprise value of Japanese 57,361 million yen (Rs 3,702.4 crore).

=== Australia ===
Lupin entered the Australian market through its subsidiary, Generic Health Pte. Ltd. (GH). It subsequently acquired the worldwide marketing rights to the over-100-year-old Australian brand Goanna, used for pain management.

=== Philippines ===
Lupin's Philippines subsidiary Multicare Pharmaceuticals (Multicare), is a branded generic company focused on Women's Health, Pediatrics, Gastro-Intestinal and Diabetes care. FY 2012 also marked its foray into the Neurology segment when it entered into a strategic marketing partnership with Sanofi.

=== Mexico & Latin America ===
In 2014, Lupin acquired 100% equity stake in Laboratories Grin, S.A. De C.V. (Grin), Mexico, a specialty pharmaceutical company engaged in the development, manufacturing and commercialization of branded ophthalmic products. This marked their entry into Mexico and the larger Latin American pharmaceuticals market. In May 2015, Lupin entered the Brazilian market with its acquisition of 100% stake in Medquímica Indústria Farmacêutica S.A., Brazil, (Medquímica).

== Corporate social responsibility ==
The Lupin Human Welfare & Research Foundation (LHWRF) was set up in 1988. The project began with a set of rural development projects centred around 35 villages in Bharatpur District, Rajasthan. Later this expanded to other regions and states. The initiative has so far reached out to over 2.8 million people across over 3,400 villages in eight states of India including Rajasthan, Madhya Pradesh, Maharashtra, Uttarakhand, Gujarat and Goa. In July 2018, Lupin foundation signed a statement of Intent with the National Institution for Transforming India (Niti Aayog), a policy think tank of the government of India, to collaborate in the Aspirational Districts Programme and support the development of three backward districts – Nandurbar in Maharashtra, Vidisha in Madhya Pradesh and Dholpur in Rajasthan.
