= Vikas Gupta (businessman) =

Indian American internet entrepreneur

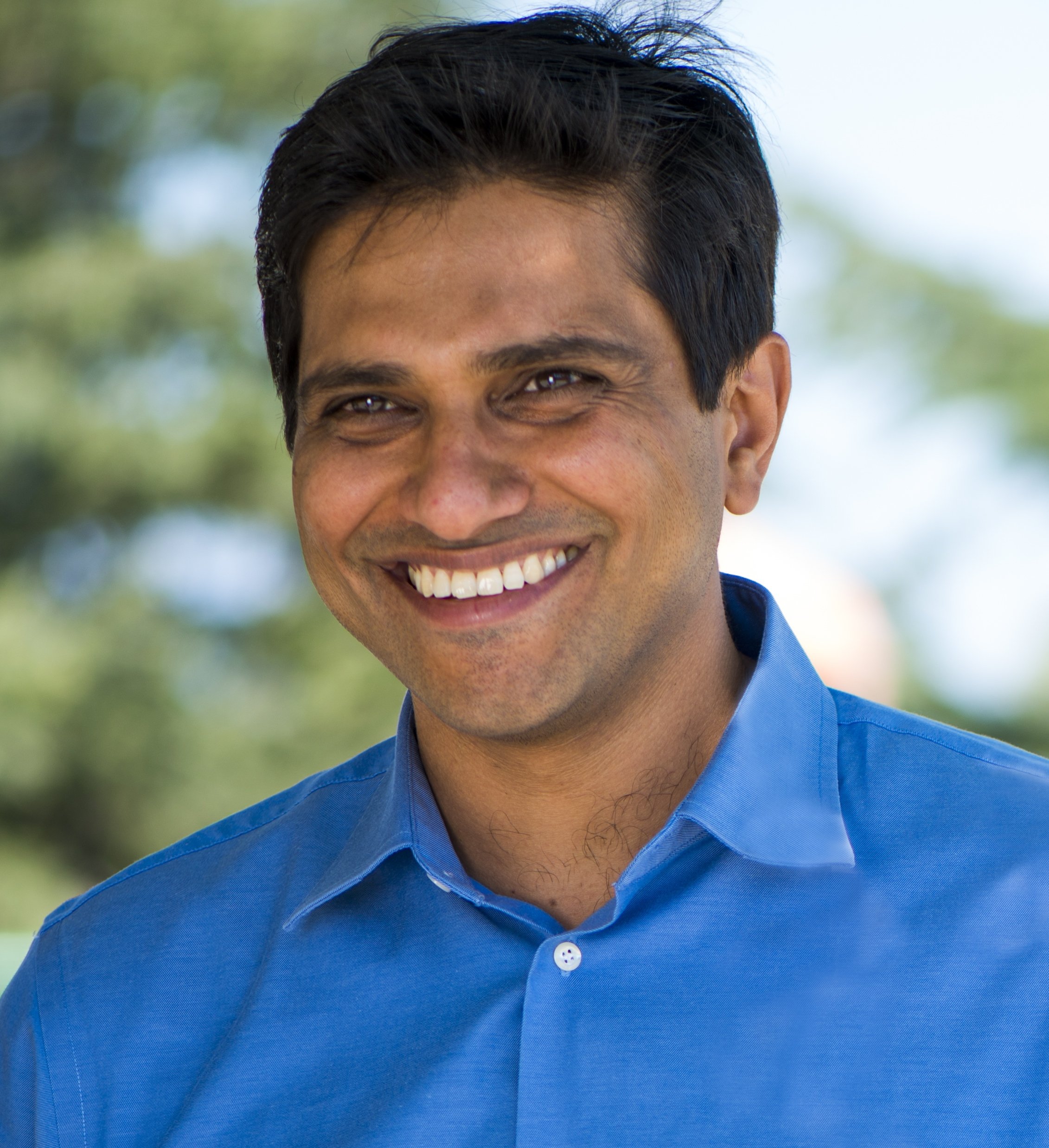
- Born: Haridwar, India
- Education: IIT Kanpur (B.Tech.), Georgia Tech (M.S.)
- Occupation: Internet entrepreneur
- Known for: Founder and CEO of Jambool; Head of Consumer Payments at Google

Vikas Gupta is an Indian American internet entrepreneur. He is known for having founded Jambool, an online company that was acquired by Google in August 2010. Gupta has also joined Google as the Head of Consumer Payments after the acquisition. Prior to founding Jambool, Gupta worked at Amazon.com, where he led the payments and web services groups. His newest venture is Play-i, which he started in November 2012.

== Early life ==
Gupta was born in Haridwar, India where his father worked at Bharat Heavy Electricals as one of the few who worked with computers. When Gupta was 12, his father left his well paying job to start his own small-scale industry in Chandigarh, and grew that business successfully over 20+ years. Gupta attributes his father as the first entrepreneur he knows and his inspiration to become an entrepreneur himself.

== Career ==
=== Amazon ===
In May 1999, Gupta joined Amazon as a software engineer. During the first few years at Amazon, he rebuilt the Amazon payments infrastructure and launched one of the earliest service-oriented architectures within Amazon. In 2003 he joined the newly formed web services team, where he took on the mission to build the payments web service to monetize the web services Amazon was embarking on building. The resulting product was the Amazon Flexible Payments Service. In 2004, Vikas co-founded Amazon's development office in Bangalore, India.

=== Jambool ===
While at Amazon, Gupta met Reza Hussein. Together, they left in 2006 to found Jambool. Jambool started out as an online collaborative research tool. In 2008, Jambool launched Social Gold, a direct payments platform for virtual goods. Over the next two years it grew to the most widely used direct payments platform by social games on Facebook.

Google acquired Jambool in August 2010.

=== Google ===
After the acquisition, Gupta joined Google as the Head of Consumer Payments. During his time at Google, he led the efforts on online payments services. The Social Gold platform was integrated and launched at Google I/O in 2011, to power payments for Chrome web store and Google+. Gupta left Google in January 2012.

=== Wonder Workshop ===
Vikas founded Wonder workshop to focus on one problem: make coding, and learning to code, fun and easy for every child through play. Wonder Workshop is building robots and software that enables children at all ages to play and code with. Wonder Workshop was launched as Play-i, and renamed to Wonder Workshop in September, 2014.

=== Patents ===
- US 7584152 Automatic authorization of programmatic transactions
- US 7502760 Providing payments automatically in accordance with predefined instructions
- US 7383231 Performing automatically authorized programmatic transactions
- US 7324976 Automatic authorization of programmatic transactions
- US 8150768 Automatic authorization of programmatic transactions
- US 8150769 Automatic authorization of programmatic transactions
- US 7729994 Performing automatically authorized programmatic transactions
- US 7742994 Providing payments automatically in accordance with predefined instructions
- US 8190588 Providing a distributed transaction information storage service
- US 8296568 Systems and methods for authenticating an electronic transaction
- US 8315945 Transferring money using a mobile electronic device
