= Speedera Networks =

Content delivery network

- Company type: Privately held
- Industry: Internet hosting services
- Founded: 1999 (acquired by Akamai Technologies in 2005)
- Founder: Ajit Gupta (CEO); Rich Day (chief architect); Eric Swildens (CTO)
- Headquarters: Santa Clara, California, United States
- Services: Content delivery
- Website: speedera.com at the Wayback Machine (archived 2004-07-17)

Speedera Networks, Inc, founded in 1999, was a content delivery network (CDN) company that emerged in the late 1990s to advance technology applications for Internet communications and collaboration and became the first CDN to turn a profit. In June 2005, Akamai acquired Speedera Networks.

A CDN is a distributed computing platform for global Internet content and application delivery, and some of the advantages it brought to the Internet and online users was dynamic imaging, Flash Video, faster website download times, increased site performance and improved business continuity and uptime. Speedera added a layer of security to Web sites, resulting in reduction of risk of distributed denial-of-service attacks and bandwidth hijacking.

== History ==
A provider of distributed application hosting and content delivery services, Speedera was founded by Ajit Gupta (CEO), Rich Day (chief architect), and Eric Swildens (CTO). The company was based in Santa Clara, California. Speedera opened its second headquarters in Bangalore, India in 2002 to offer 24x7 operations and customer support as well as sales, marketing and additional R&D capacity. Investors backing Speedera included Stanford University and Trinity Ventures.

Despite the end of the dot-com bubble in 2000 and a large number of competitors (30-plus at that time), Speedera had patented technology, a significant cost advantage and a customer focused sales philosophy that enabled the company to survive the economic downturn and grow rapidly enough to eventually achieve a profitable annual revenue run rate of $60 million. In 2003 and 2004, both Deloitte & Touche and PricewaterhouseCoopers recognized Speedera as one of the top 10 fastest growing private companies in Silicon Valley and in North America.

The company initially was created to cache static Web content through its vast network and direct users to the optimum server through intelligent traffic management and quickly transformed itself to deliver dynamic imaging, rich dynamic content and accelerated Web applications using the same platform.

Speedera enabled companies to offer bandwidth-intensive content, graphics, and streaming media over the Web. It operated servers on more than 1,000 backbone networks in the Americas, Europe and the Asia-Pacific region, putting the content physically closer to users, and speeding up downloads and streaming. Speedera built its network to more than 100 points-of-presence (PoPs) within ata centers in 20 countries.

Speedera at acquisition had more than 400 customers, including large companies. They included Fox Broadcasting Corporation, Amazon.com, Apple, Sony Music Entertainment, Nokia, Comcast, NASA, the European Space Agency, Walmart, Bank of America, Lowe's, The U.S. Department of Homeland Security, The Weather Channel, Nissan, NPR, iFilm, Atom Shockwave, Univision, Sirius Satellite Radio, the National Hockey League, the U.S. National Guard, Hoovers, Tag Heuer, Oracle, Microsoft, Cisco, Verizon, Yahoo, Intuit, Intel, AMD, Macromedia, McAfee, Network Associates, Symantec, RSA Security, Inc., Hewlett-Packard, Intel, Softbank, Sify, Rediff and The Times of India.[4]

Channel partners included HP Services, Internap, Softbank Broadmedia/Club IT, Hitachi, AboveNet, and Inflow (Sungard).

== Services ==
Speedera's services included streaming media, content delivery, failover, load balancing, security, visibility and management services, all based on its Global Traffic Management (GTM) platform and patented technology.

In 2005, Speedera announced FlexComputing. FlexComputing enabled enterprises to rapidly deploy and update applications as needed in multiple hosting locations. FlexComputing represented the third stage of utility computing, a field in which Speedera had been a pioneer since its founding in 1999. The first stage entailed distributed caching of Web site content, particularly graphical objects. The next stage extended this model to downloadable media, video streaming files and whole site delivery. FlexComputing took the model one step further, to the third stage, by deploying customers` own applications on Speedera's global network and providing additional hosting capacity on demand for any distributed application running on an Intel platform. This distributed hosting solution enabled customer applications to be higher performing, more scalable, more reliable and more resistant to security attacks, while eliminating the need for customers to invest in added server and network infrastructure.

== Patents ==
Speedera was issued 21 patents ranging from load balancing to integrated point of presence (PoP) server networks. Twelve of those were issued to co-founder and CEO Ajit Gupta. These patents included:

- Dynamic image delivery system
- Global traffic management system using IP anycast routing and dynamic load-balancing
- Performance computer network method
- Method for determining metrics of a content delivery and global traffic management network
- Integrated point of presence server network
- Content delivery and global traffic management network system
- Secure content delivery system
- Load balancing service
- Load balancing array packet routing system
- Performance computer network method
- Content delivery and global traffic management network system
- Load balancing service
- Method and system for generating and providing rich media presentations optimized for a device over a network
- Method and apparatus for determining latency between multiple servers and a client
- Scalable domain name system with persistence and load balancing
- Method and system for delivering and monitoring an on-demand playlist over a network using a template
- Scalable domain name system with persistence and load balancing
- Content delivery and global traffic management network system
- Performance computer network method
- User device and system for traffic management and content distribution over a worldwide area network
- Integrated point of presence server network

== Company ==
=== Notable events ===
Speedera hosted some of the largest trafficked events on the Internet in its time including NASA's twin Mars rover mission, and China's annual Spring Festival. The company also created SpeedRank, an Internet Performance Index that compared performance and availability of the world's best and least performing web sites, which included download summaries, details and errors.

Speedera launched a number of technology firsts in the Content Delivery Network market category including: Site Analyzer, Whole Site Delivery, Secure Streaming, Secure Flash, Failover, Traffic Balancer, Origin Site Integration, SpeedEye Access Manager, Smart Storage Manager and SinoCDN (a joint CDN with China).

Speedera's category-defining set of services included:

- The world's first and highest-rated performance service-based global traffic management
- The world's fastest content delivery network (as rated by Keynote Systems)
- The world's largest streaming edge network
- The world's first failover service
- Ease and speed of implementation which set the industry standard

As a reward for performance, the entire staff of Speedera was flown to Hawaii in 2003. In 2005, the entire staff and their families, based in Bangalore and Silicon Valley, were also flown to Hawaii.

In February 2002, Akamai Technologies filed a lawsuit claiming that Speedera's content delivery network services infringed on Akamai patents.

In June 2002, Speedera's three co-founders received U.S. patent 6,405,252 covering the global traffic management and content delivery technologies of its network.

In March 2005, Speedera Networks was acquired by Akamai (NASDAQ: AKAM) for a stock transaction worth about $130 million. The acquisition was completed in June 2005.

=== Investors ===
Speedera Networks was a privately held company funded by leading Silicon Valley companies, venture capitalists, a world-class university and others including:

- Bank of America securities
- Hewlett-Packard
- Deutsche Bank AG
- Continuum Group
- Oracle Corporation
- ABS Ventures
- Stanford University
- Trinity Ventures
- Palo Alto Investors
- Industry Ventures

=== Awards ===
- Deloitte & Touche Top 50 Private Companies of North America (2004)
- PricewaterhouseCoopers: Top Ten Fastest Growing Company in Silicon Valley (2003 and 2004)
- Speedera Named to Silicon India 100 for 2003: Top Hundred Companies Founded & Managed by Indians
- Streaming Magazine Readers Choose Speedera as Best CDN and Up-and-Coming Streaming Company to Watch
- 2002 SIIA CODIE Award
- SIIA Recognizes Speedera's SpeedSuite as the Best Internet Facilitation Service
- UPSIDE Magazine's Hot 100 (2002)
- Aberdeen's Top 10 Streaming Implementations of 2001

== Philanthropy ==
In 2003, CEO Ajit Gupta established a "Giving Back" philanthropy program for Speedera that provided free Internet infrastructure services to not-for-profit organizations, including Unicef.org, Goodwill Industries International, Autism.org, and the St. Jude Children's Research Hospital.

In response to the deadly Christmas tsunami of 2004 in the Indian Ocean, Speedera assisted UNICEF and other relief and recovery organizations by allocating a percentage of its infrastructure at no cost to ensure the expansion and availability of their websites to accept contributions and help victims and other families communicate with each other. It also provided pro bono services to a number of other organizations working towards a worthy cause.
