= Integrated Systems Inc. =

Defunct American software company

Integrated Systems Inc. (ISI)
- Industry: Software
- Founded: 1981; 45 years ago in California, United States
- Founder: Naren Gupta
- Defunct: 2000; 26 years ago
- Fate: Acquired by Wind River Systems and ultimately by Intel
- Headquarters: Sunnyvale, California, USA
- Products: operating systems, control design software

Integrated Systems Inc. (ISI) was an embedded software company founded by Naren Gupta in 1980/1981. Summit Partners invested in 1987, the company listed in 1990, and it was acquired by Wind River Systems in 2000.

Naren Gupta served as President/CEO of ISI until 1994, and as its chairman until the company was bought by their competitor Wind River Systems in February 2000. Later he served as vice-chairman and CEO of Wind River Systems.

== Products ==
The company's main products were:

- MATRIX_{x}, introduced in 1983, a control engineering (computer aided control system design or CACSD) tool with components including XMath (an extended MATLAB-like language) and SystemBuild for graphical editing of block diagrams. After the merger with Wind River the product was licensed to MathWorks, but after an anti-trust action, it was sold to National Instruments. In 2018, National Instruments placed MATRIX_{x} into a five-year end-of-life phase, with no further support beyond 30 June 2023.
- pSOS, a real-time operating system for the Motorola 68000 microprocessor family acquired from Software Components Group (SCG) for US$20 million in 1991.
- FlexOS, a continuation of Digital Research's Concurrent DOS 286 and Concurrent DOS 68K, a modular multiuser multitasking real-time operating system (RTOS) for Motorola 68000 as well as for Intel 186, 286 and 386 microprocessors designed for computer-integrated manufacturing, laboratory, retail and financial markets; acquired from Novell for US$3 million in July 1994. The deal comprised a direct payment of half this sum, and shares representing 2% of the company.
