= Ajit Gupta =

Indian entrepreneur (1961–2016)

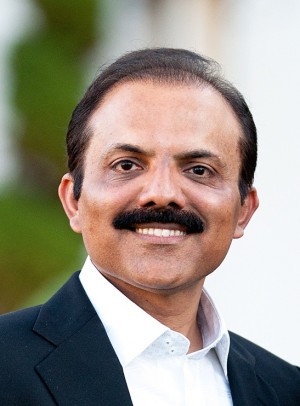
- Born: Ajit Kumar Gupta; September 12, 1961; Allahabad, Uttar Pradesh, India
- Died: October 7, 2016 (aged 55); Fremont, California, U.S.
- Education: Indian Institute of Technology, Roorkee
- Occupations: Founder; CEO
- Spouse: Seema Gupta
- Children: Varun Gupta; Juhi Gupta
- Website: www.aryaka.com

Ajit Gupta was a Silicon Valley–based entrepreneur and the founder of Aryaka, AAyuja, JantaKhoj, and Speedera Networks. He holds 21 technology patents for Internet content delivery and global traffic management. Ajit Gupta graduated from Indian Institute of Technology Roorkee in Electrical Engineering Batch of 1984.

Ajit Gupta died on October 7, 2016. He was survived by his wife (also an IIT-Roorkee graduate) and two children.

== Career ==
Gupta was a founder of Aryaka, a cloud-based WAN Optimization and application acceleration company. Founded in 2009, and headquartered in Milpitas, California, with offices in Bangalore, India, Aryaka employs more than one hundred and fifty people worldwide. Gupta and his team have raised US$59.5 million in four rounds of funding from InterWest Partners, Presidio Ventures, a Sumitomo Corporation Company, Trinity Ventures, Mohr Davidow Ventures, and Nexus Venture Partners.

Gupta's first successful venture was a company he co-founded in 1999 – Speedera Networks. Speedera was acquired in 2005 by Akamai Technologies (NASDAQ: AKAM).

After Speedera, Gupta founded AAyuja, a technology sales acceleration company, serving as its CEO. He was Chairman of the company. Gupta was also the Chairman and Founder at JantaKhoj, an India-based premium background verification service provider, which had also built the first and the largest people search engine on Indians.

Gupta was a notable alumni of the Boys' High School & College (Allahabad, Uttar Pradesh), (BHS), an independent school in Allahabad, India.

== Honors ==
Gupta won The Big Idea Award (for the most disruptive business model in the past 12–18 months) at The Innovator Awards 2013. Gupta was recognized by the Golden Bridge Awards for leadership and innovation in October 2012 for launching Aryaka's WAN Optimization as-a-Service offering. Gartner, Inc. recognized his company Aryaka as a 'Cool Vendor' for 'Enterprise Communications and Network Services' in April 2011. The company was also named a GigaOM Structure 50 Company in May 2011 and CRN recognized Aryaka as a "Hot Emerging Vendor" in June 2011. Gupta has spoken at conferences around the world, including GigaOM Structure 2011, Cloud Connect,Red Herring, Kagan Digital Media Summits, Datacenter Ventures events, and Streaming Media. A notable alumni of IIT-Roorkee, he is a founding board member of the IIT-Roorkee Heritage Fund.

== Philanthropy ==
In 2003, Gupta established a philanthropy program for Speedera called "Giving Back", which provided free Internet infrastructure services to non-profit organizations including Unicef.org, Goodwill Industries International, Autism.org, and the St. Jude Children's Research Hospital. Under Gupta's leadership, Speedera assisted UNICEF during the 2004 Indian Ocean earthquake and tsunami by providing pro-bono services to enable UNICEF websites to accept contributions and to help victims and families communicate with each other.
