= Aryaka =

American technology company

Aryaka Networks, Inc.
- Company type: Private
- Industry: Cloud computing
- Founded: 2009; 17 years ago
- Headquarters: Santa Clara, California
- Website: www.aryaka.com

Aryaka is a company that provides Unified SASE as a Service including wide-area software-defined networking (SD-WAN) connectivity, application delivery and network security. Aryaka is headquartered in Santa Clara, California with additional offices located in Hamburg, Germany, and Bengaluru, India.

== History ==
Aryaka was founded in 2009 by Ajit Gupta, Rajeev Bharadhwaj and Ashwath Nagaraj. Gupta previously founded Speedera Networks, a content delivery network (CDN) acquired by Akamai Technologies in 2005 for stock valued at $500 million. Bharadhwaj was previously at cloud service provider Ejasent Inc, acquired by Veritas in 2004 for $59 million. Nagaraj was previously at Allegro Systems (acquired by Cisco Systems in 2001 for $185 million) and founder of Assured Access Technologies (acquired by Alcatel in 1999 for $350 million).

Aryaka announced its service in September 2010.

Aryaka raised $50 million from Goldman Sachs Growth Equity Fund. Previously it had raised a smaller $14M Series-E and had earlier received $45 million in Series D funding in a round led by from Third Point Ventures, adding new investor Deutsche Telekom Capital Partners (DTCP), and with participation from existing investors. In March 2016, it received $16 million in Series C funding from existing investors, Nexus Venture Partners. It previously received $10 million in Series C funding from Trinity Ventures, $25 million in series C funding led by Interwest Partners, $15 million in series B funding and $14 million in series A funding from Trinity Ventures, Mohr Davidow Ventures, and Nexus Venture Partners. Aryaka's foundational multi-segment WAN optimization patent was granted as a US patent in July 2013.

Aryaka built a network to offer its managed wide-area network (WAN). It develops its own technology that includes WAN optimization, multi-cloud connectivity including AWS, Azure, Google Cloud, Oracle Cloud, and Alibaba Cloud, and delivers security as-a-service with partners that include Checkpoint, Palo Alto Networks, and Zscaler.

== See also ==
- Application delivery network
- Cloud computing
