= Móvil =

Móvil may refer to:

- Edwin Móvil (born 1986), Colombian footballer
- América Móvil, Mexican telecommunication company headquartered in Mexico City, Mexico
- Colombia Móvil, the third largest mobile phone company in Colombia
- CTI Movil or Claro Argentina, Paraguay and Uruguay, mobile network operator with headquarters in Córdoba, Argentina

== See also ==
- Columna Móvil Teófilo Forero, Revolutionary Armed Forces of Colombia or FARC, a Marxist–Leninist revolutionary guerrilla organization
- Movial
- Movila (disambiguation)
- Moville
- Noville (disambiguation)
