= Calculate Linux =

Linux distribution

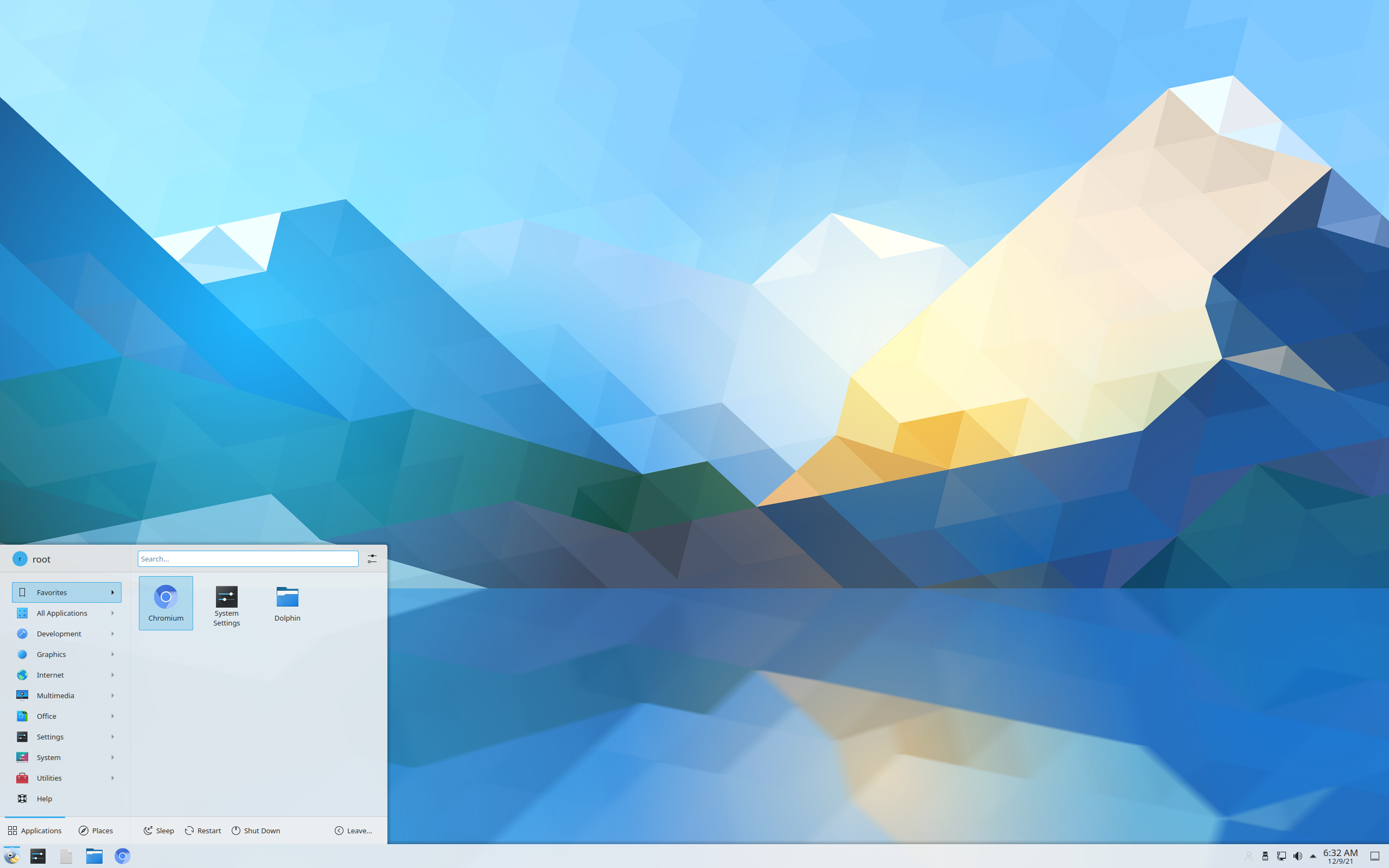
- Calculate Linux Desktop 22 with KDE Plasma 5
- Developer: Calculate Linux team
- OS family: Linux (Unix-like)
- Working state: Current
- Source model: Open source
- Initial release: 6 June 2007; 19 years ago
- Latest release: 23 / 29 December 2022; 3 years ago
- Available in: English, Spanish, German, Portuguese, Italian, Romanian, Russian, Ukrainian, Polish and French
- Package manager: Portage
- Kernel type: Monolithic Linux
- Userland: Gentoo Linux
- Default user interface: Cinnamon, KDE Plasma, LXQt, MATE or XFCE.
- License: Various, mostly GNU GPL
- Official website: www.calculate-linux.org

Calculate Linux is a Linux distribution optimized for fast deployment in an organizational environment. It is based on the Gentoo Linux project and includes many preconfigured functions.

Calculate Linux is distributed in five flavours: Calculate Linux Desktop (CLD), Calculate Directory Server (CDS), Calculate Linux Scratch (CLS), Calculate Scratch Server (CSS), and Calculate Linux Container (CLC).

Bootable live CDs are available for all versions. They can be used to install Calculate Linux on a hard disk drive or USB flash drive.

== Features ==
Calculate Linux features rolling release model of binary updates, however, it remains compatible with Gentoo source packages through Portage. It features a custom graphical installer allowing the user to configure many options during the install including the preference of Pulse Audio or Advanced Linux Sound Architecture (ALSA) for sound. It can be installed on a USB flash drive or hard drive with ext4, ext3, ext2, ReiserFS, btrfs, XFS, jfs, NILFS2 or FAT32. The Interactive System Build allows changing the distribution and creating new ISO images.

Calculate Linux does not use systemd and instead uses the OpenRC init system.

Calculate Linux includes a natively developed set of tools named Calculate Utilities, based on the Qt5 framework. These tools offer the option to configure and update the system as well and assemble custom LiveCD images.

== Versions ==
- Calculate Linux Desktop Cinnamon/KDE/LXQt/MATE/Xfce is a desktop based on Cinnamon, KDE, LXQt or Xfce intended as a client/workstation. Features quick installation, easy system updates and ability to store user accounts on the server.
- Calculate Directory Server can act as a domain controller and can configure Samba, Mail, XMPP, Proxy services using simple Unix-like commands supplied by the Calculate 3 utility package.
- Calculate Linux Scratch is intended primarily for administrators and users, who want to have their own Linux distribution optimized for specific situations.
- Calculate Scratch Server, a minimal server with only the Linux Kernel and Calculate Utilities.
- Calculate Linux Container, is created specially to be installed in a LXC/LXD container.

== Version history ==
Version	Release date	Kernel version
9.5	29 April 2009	—N/a
9.6	28 May 2009	—N/a
9.7	26 September 2009	—N/a
9.9	29 September 2009	—N/a
10.0	3 December 2009	2.6.31.6
10.0.1	December 2009	2.6.32.5
10.2	12 January 2010	2.6.32.8
10.4	8 April 2010	2.6.32.11
10.9	8 October 2010	2.6.35.5
11.0	21 January 2011	2.6.36.3
11.3	12 March 2011	2.6.36.3
11.6	30 June 2011	2.6.38.8
11.6.1	24 July 2011	2.6.38.8
11.9	1 October 2011	3.0.4
11.12	29 December 2011	3.1.6
11.15	14 March 2012	3.2.8
12.0	28 July 2012	3.4.5
12.0.2	17 August 2012	3.4.5
12.0.3	2 September 2012	3.5.3
13	28 December 2012	3.6.7
13.4	21 April 2013	3.8.4
13.6	22 June 2013	3.9.6
13.6.2	17 October 2013	3.10.15
13.11	23 November 2013	3.10.19
13.11.1	5 March 2014	3.12
13.19	2 July 2014	3.14.9
14	5 September 2014	3.14.17
14.12	17 December 2014	3.14.25
14.12.1	31 December 2014	3.14.27
14.16	21 April 2015	3.18.11
14.16.2	5 June 2015	3.18.14
15	30 September 2015	3.18.20
15.12	31 December 2015	4.2.8
15.17	20 May 2016	4.4.9
17	30 December 2016	
17.6	1 July 2017	
17.12	30 December 2017	4.14
17.12.2	22 February 2018	4.14.19
18	7 October 2018	4.18.12
18.12	29 December 2018	4.19.9
20	27 December 2019	5.4.6
20.6	21 June 2020	5.4.45
21	28 April 2021	5.10.32
22	8 December 2021	5.15.6
22.0.1	9 February 2022	5.15.16

== Reception ==
In 2017, Robert Rijkhoff reviewed Calculate Linux 17.6 for DistroWatch Weekly:

If you're interested in Gentoo but don't want to dive in head-first then Calculate might be for you. The project's documentation could be improved but if you're an experienced Linux user than I'm sure you'll slowly get familiar with Portage's more advanced features. I think people who want to avoid systemd should also consider Calculate. The distro is perfectly usable without ever compiling software from source. Everything "just worked" and the developers have clearly made a huge effort to make a polished operating system.

== See also ==
- Artix Linux
- Sabayon Linux
