= Sabayon =

Sabayon may refer to:

- Zabaione, a custard known as sabayon in French cuisine
- Sabayon Linux, a computer operating system
