= Daniel Robbins =

Daniel Robbins may refer to:

- Daniel Robbins (art historian) (1932-1995), onetime director of the Fogg Museum
- Daniel Robbins (computer programmer), founder of the Gentoo Linux project
- Daniel Robbins (director), director of Pledge (2018 film)
