= Written in itself =

Written in itself may refer to:

- Self-interpreter
- Self-hosting
