= Aztec C =

- Developer: Manx Software Systems
- Type: Compiler

Aztec C is a discontinued C programming language compiler for CP/M-80, MS-DOS, Apple II (both Apple DOS 3.3 and ProDOS), Commodore 64, early Macintosh, Amiga, and Atari ST. It was sold commercially by Manx Software Systems.

== History ==
Manx Software Systems of Shrewsbury, New Jersey produced C programming language compilers beginning in the 1980s for CP/M, Apple II, IBM PC compatibles, Macintosh, and other systems.

Manx was started by Harry Suckow, with partners Thomas Fenwick, and James Goodnow II, the two principal developers. They were all working together at another company at the time. Suckow had started several companies of his own anticipating the impending growth of the personal computer market. A demand came for compilers first and he disengaged himself from the other companies to pursue Manx and Aztec C.

Another developer, Chris Macey, assisted them momentarily with 80XX development, apart from other areas.

One of the main reasons for Aztec C's early success was the floating point support in the Z80 compiler, which was extended to the Apple II shortly after.

During the move to ANSI C in 1989, Robert Sherry represented them on the ANSI committee but left shortly after. He also fixed numerous bugs in the Aztec C after Chris Macey and Thomas Fenwick left the company.

By this time Microsoft had targeted competitors for their C compiler and Aztec C was being pushed-out of the general IBM PC compatible compiler market, followed by competition with Apple's MPW C on the Macintosh side and Lattice C on the Amiga after SAS bought them.

In 1989 Thomas Fenwick left to work for Microsoft, and James Goodnow worked on Aztec C occasionally but was pursuing other projects outside the company and eventually left the company altogether. Chris Macey returned as a consultant but eventually left to become chief scientist for another company.

Throughout the 1990s they continued to make their Aztec C compiler. As their market share dropped, they tried to make the move to specializing in embedded systems development, but it was too late. They disappeared in the late 1990s following the loss of market presence of some of their target platforms (various 6502 machines, Atari and Amiga 68xxx, etc.).

In the end, Jeff Davis and Mike Spille helped Harry Suckow keep the company going before Suckow finally closed it. Suckow is still the copyright holder for Aztec C.

Many developers used the Aztec C compiler until it became operationally extinct.

== Reception ==
BYTE in February 1989 approved of Aztec C for DOS's portability with other platforms, and found that it produced the smallest executables. The magazine reported that compiled code benchmarked poorly, however and libraries "exhibited some obscure bugs, surprising in such a mature product". BYTE concluded that "Aztec C suffers more than it benefits from its long and diverse heritage".

== Legacy ==
At least two free Internet distributions exist for native Aztec C compilers for the Apple II; one for DOS 3.3 and the other for ProDOS 8. Free Internet distributions exist for the Amiga, MS-DOS, and a limited version of the MS-DOS cross-compiler for Apple II ProDOS 8.
