= Pieter Van den Abeele =

Computer programmer

Pieter Van den Abeele is a computer programmer, and the founder of the PowerPC-version of Gentoo Linux, a foundation connected with a distribution of the Linux computer operating system. He founded Gentoo for OS X, for which he received a scholarship by Apple Computer. In 2004 Pieter was invited to the OpenSolaris pilot program and assisted Sun Microsystems with building a development eco-system around Solaris. Pieter was nominated for the OpenSolaris Community Advisory Board and managed a team of developers to make Gentoo available on the Solaris operating system as well. Pieter is a co-author of the Gentoo handbook.

The teams managed by Pieter Van den Abeele have shaped the PowerPC landscape with several "firsts". Gentoo/PowerPC was the first distribution to introduce PowerPC Live CDs. Gentoo also beat Apple to releasing a full 64-bit PowerPC userland environment for the IBM PowerPC 970 (G5) processor.

His Gentoo-based Home Media and Communication System, based on a Freescale Semiconductor PowerPC 7447 processor won the Best of Show award at the inaugural 2005 Freescale Technology Forum in Orlando, Florida. Pieter is also a member of the Power.org consortium and participates in committees and workgroups focusing on disruptive business plays around the Power Architecture.
