= Scratchbox 2 =

- Original author: Nokia
- Developer: Jolla
- Initial release: 2009-04-01

Stable release(s)
- 2.2.4 / 2012-04-01

Preview release(s)
- 2.3.90 / 2012-09-05
- Written in: C
- Operating system: Linux
- Platform: Cross-platform
- Type: Build automation
- License: LGPL 2.1
- Website: github.com/sailfishos/scratchbox2

Scratchbox 2 (often abbreviated to "sb2" or "sbox2") is a cross-compilation toolkit designed to make embedded Linux application development easier. It also provides a full set of tools to integrate and cross-compile an entire Linux distribution.

== Predecessor ==
Scratchbox was a Linux embedded application development toolkit which also provided cross-compilation support for Linux distributions.

The project was initially developed by Movial and was sponsored by Nokia. It was licensed under the GNU General Public License (GPL).

Scratchbox was designed for the Maemo development platform (Nokia 770, N800, N810 Internet Tablets and Nokia N900 and N9 phones) and supported ARM architecture and x86. Targets like PowerPC and MIPS architecture worked at experimental level.

== Functional description ==
In the Linux world, when building software, many parameters are auto-detected on the host system (like installed libraries and system configuration), for example through Autotools' ./configure scripts. When one wants to build software for an embedded target by cross-compilation, most auto-detected parameters are incorrect: I.e. host configuration is not the same as the embedded target's configuration, hence the name cross-compilation.

Without Scratchbox 2, one has to manually set many parameters and "hack" the "configure process" to generate working executable code for the embedded target.

Scratchbox 2 allows one to set up a "virtual" environment that will trick Autotools and other executables into thinking that they are directly running on the embedded target with its configuration.

Moreover, Scratchbox 2 provides a technique called "CPU-transparency" that goes further: With "CPU-transparency", executables built for the host CPU or for the target CPU could be executed directly on the host with sb2 handling the task to emulate a different CPU-architecture if necessary to run software components compiled for the target CPU. Hence a build process can mix using programs built for different CPU-architectures. That is especially useful when a build process requires to build a software component first as a build dependency for building another software component: For example, a "Lexer" must be built first in order to generate code for / of another software component with it.

== Historic Git repositories of Scratchbox 2 ==
- BinChengfei/scratchbox2 at GitHub provided an unaltered mirror of the former Scratchbox 2 Git repository at Gitorious with its latest Git tag being 2.3.90 on 2012-09-05.
- lbt/scratchbox2 (up to tag pkg-mer-2.3.90-4 on 2013-04-25) and mer-packages/scratchbox2 (up to tag 2.3.90-git2 on 2014-03-05), both at GitHub, show intermediate states before the Nemo / Mer merger, when Scratchbox 2's active source tree was moved to the now dissolved git.merproject.org.
- The continuation of the former source code repository git.merproject.org/mer-core/scratchbox2 is sailfishos/scratchbox2 at GitHub, which contains all commit history and Git tags of all aforementioned Git repositories.
