= GNOME Terminator =

Terminal emulator influenced by GNOME Terminal

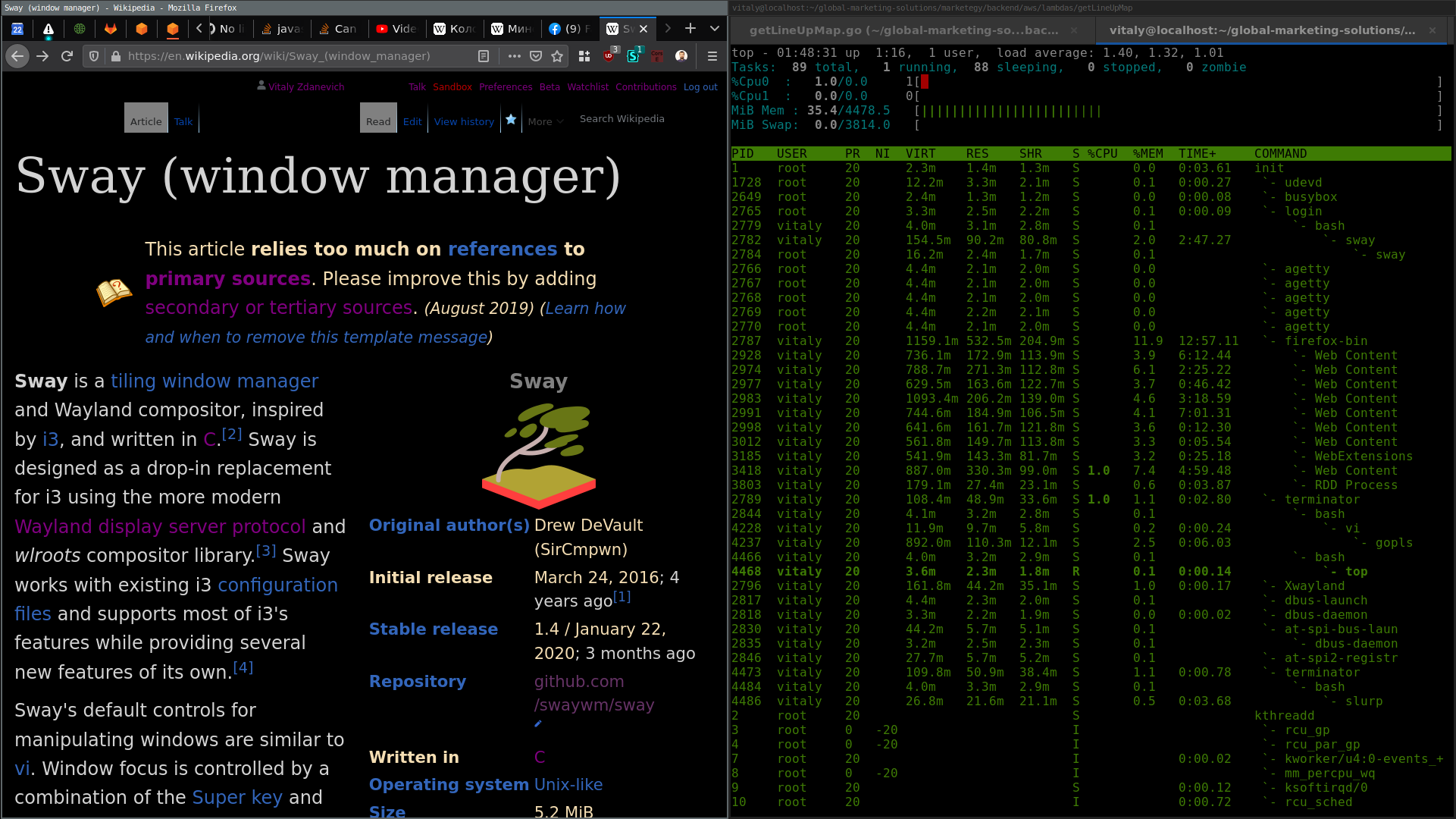
- Screenshot of the GNOME Terminator
- Stable release: 2.1.5 / 22 May 2025; 7 months ago
- Repository: github.com/gnome-terminator/terminator
- Written in: Python
- Operating system: Linux and Unix-like
- Type: Terminal Emulator
- License: GNU General Public License, version 2.0
- Website: gnome-terminator.org

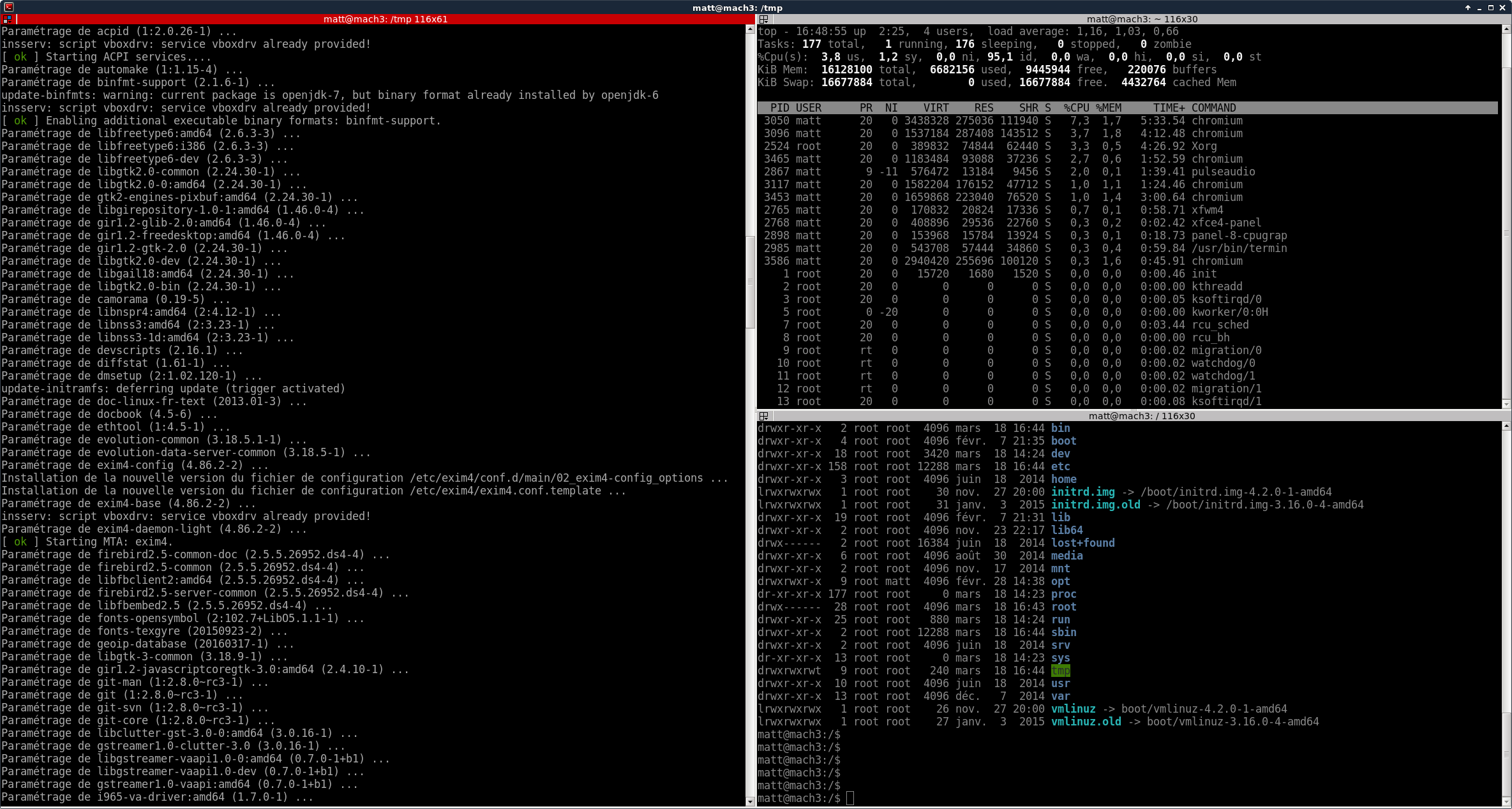

On Gentoo Linux, installing software

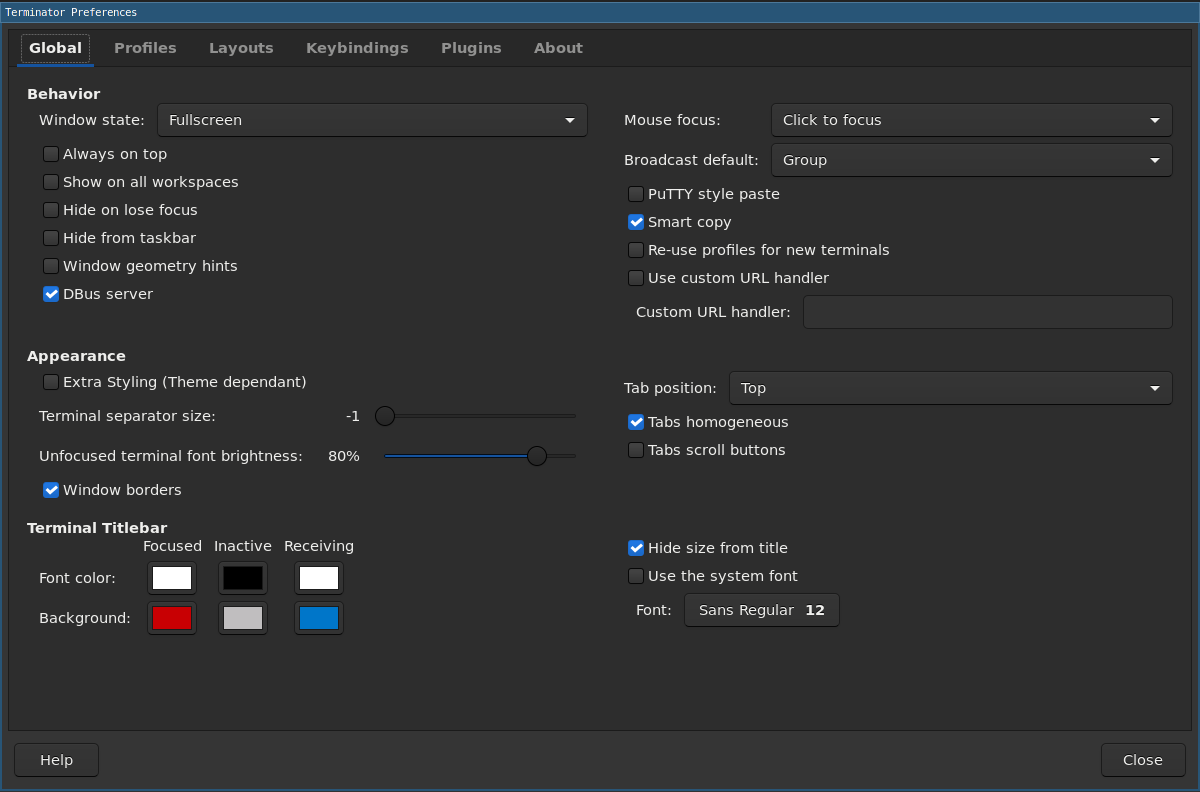
Preferences screen: Global tab

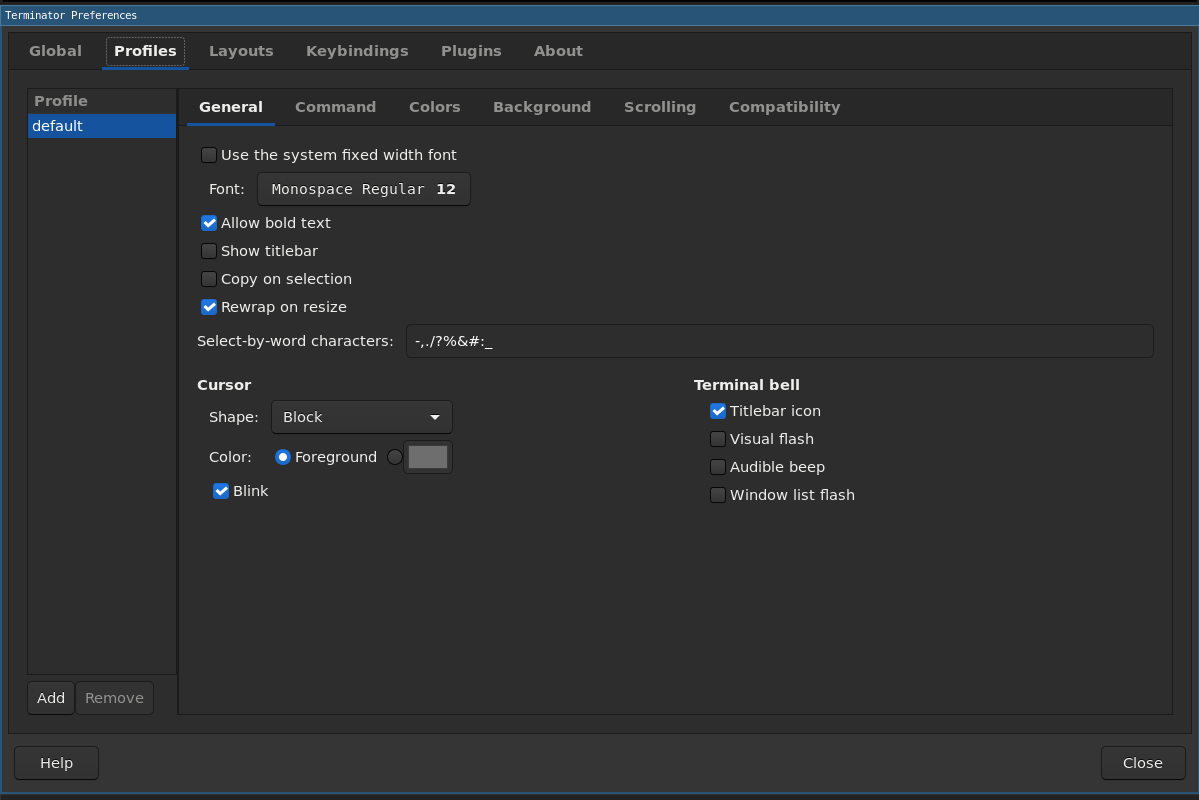
Preferences screen: Profile tab

GNOME Terminator is a free and open-source terminal emulator for Linux programmed in Python, licensed under GPL-2.0-only. The goal of the project is to produce a useful tool for arranging terminals. It is inspired by programs such as gnome-multi-term, QuadKonsole, etc. In that the main focus is arranging terminals in grids (tabs is the most common default method, which Terminator also supports). Terminator packages exist for Arch, Debian/Ubuntu, Fedora, OpenSUSE, Gentoo, Snap, FreeBSD, OpenBSD. In 2017 took second place in voting at opensource.com, after Gnome Terminal.

== History ==
Terminator is not a fork of GNOME Terminal (which is written in C); instead, it was developed from scratch by Chris Jones, entirely in Python (based on PyGObject to interact with the desktop environment and Python VTE providing the GUI component), but much of the behavior of Terminator is based on GNOME Terminal. Terminator began from vte-demo.py in VTE and the gedit terminal plugin, which was useful to the authors for figuring out VTE's API.

In July 2013, Steve Boddy succeeded Jones and took the lead of the project.

GTK3+ support started near the end of 2012. The first version supporting GTK3+ was published by the end of 2016.

In April 2020 the project was forked to GitHub due to a lack of activity on Launchpad.

== Features ==
The following features are available in the 2.x release of Terminator.

- Arrange terminals in a grid-like structure
- Tabs
- Drag and drop re-ordering of terminals
- Lots of keyboard shortcuts
- Save multiple layouts and profiles via GUI preferences editor
- Simultaneous typing to arbitrary groups of terminals
- Ability to hide a scrollbar
- Extensible through plugins
