= MocaccinoOS =

Gentoo-based Linux distribution

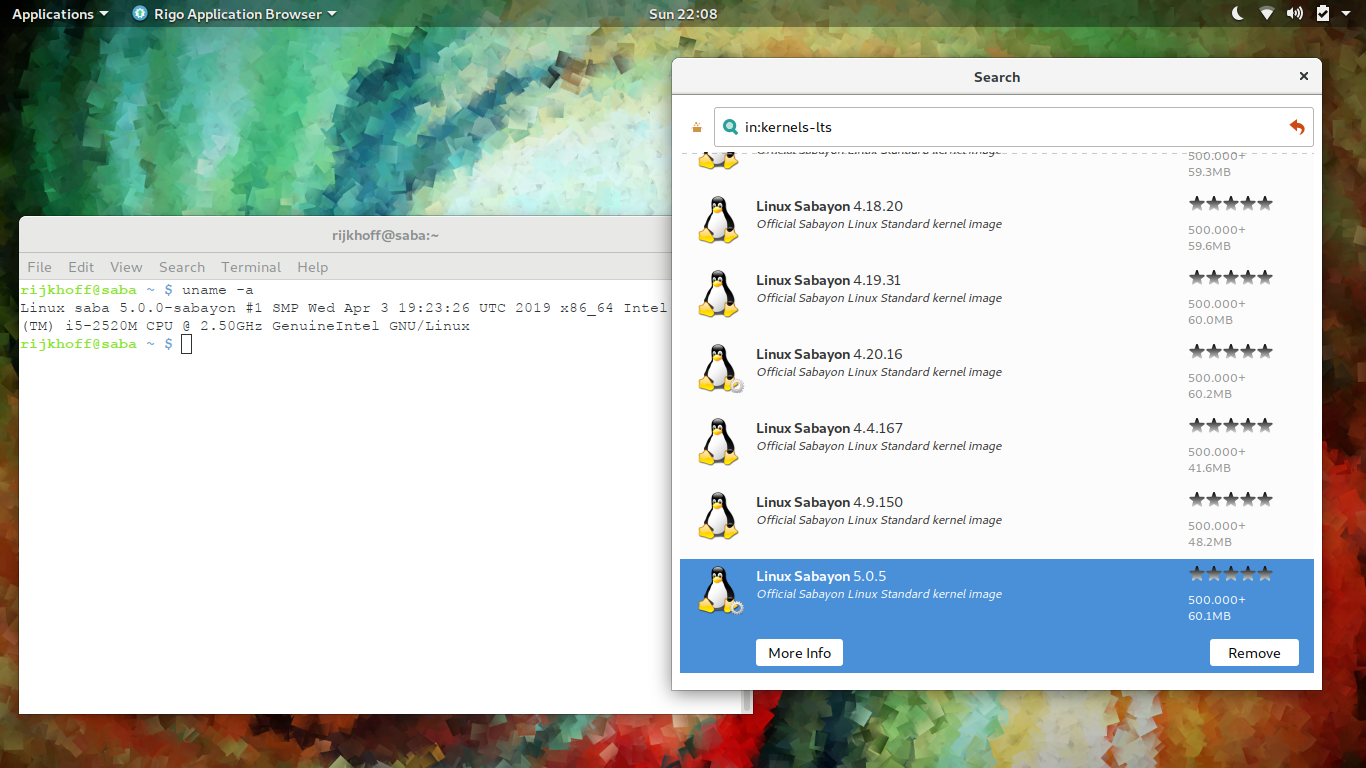
- Sabayon Linux 19.03 with GNOME 3
- Developer: Fabio Erculiani and Team
- OS family: Linux (Unix-like)
- Working state: Discontinued, Replaced by MocaccinoOS.
- Source model: Mixed
- Initial release: 28 November 2005; 20 years ago
- Latest release: (Rolling release) 19.03 / 31 March 2019; 7 years ago
- Update method: Entropy (Equo, Rigo) / Emerge
- Package manager: Entropy (Equo, Rigo) / Portage
- Supported platforms: x86-64, previously also IA-32
- Kernel type: Monolithic kernel (Linux)
- Userland: GNU
- Default user interface: GNOME; KDE; Xfce; MATE; Fluxbox
- License: Various; mainly GNU GPL
- Official website: www.mocaccino.org www.sabayon.org^{(dead link, archive)}

MocaccinoOS (formerly Sabayon Linux, RR4 Linux and RR64 Linux) is a container-based Linux distribution. Its predecessor, Sabayon Linux, was an Italian Gentoo-based Linux distribution created by Fabio Erculiani and the Sabayon development team. Sabayon followed the "out of the box" philosophy, aiming to give the user a wide number of applications ready to use and a self-configured operating system.

Sabayon Linux featured a rolling release cycle, its own software repository and a package management system called Entropy. Sabayon was available in both x86 and AMD64 distributions and there was support for ARMv7 in development for the BeagleBone.

It was named after an Italian dessert, zabaione, which is made from eggs. Sabayon's logo was an impression of a chicken foot. In November 2020 it was announced that future Sabayon Linux versions would be based on Funtoo instead of Gentoo Linux. Sabayon Linux inspired MocaccinoOS container-based distribution. In late 2020, it announced its transition and rebranding to MocaccinoOS, a minimalist Linux distribution which deploys Luet, a custom-built package manager. The derivative is reported to be more user-friendly than its Sabayon predecessor.

== Editions ==
Since version 4.1, Sabayon had been released in two different flavors featuring either the GNOME or KDE desktop environments, with the ultralight Fluxbox environment included as well. (In the previous versions all three environments were included in a DVD ISO image).

Since Sabayon's initial release, additional versions of Sabayon have added other X environments, including Xfce and LXDE. A CoreCD edition which featured a minimal install of Sabayon was released to allow the creation of spins of the Sabayon operating system; however, this was later discontinued and replaced by CoreCDX (fluxbox window manager) and Spinbase (no X environment) first and by "Sabayon Minimal" later. A ServerBase edition was released which featured a server-optimized kernel and a small footprint, but this was later discontinued and integrated into the "Sabayon Minimal".

Daily build images were available to Sabayon testers, but were released weekly to the public on the system mirrors containing stable releases. Official releases were simply DAILY versions which had received deeper testing. The adoption of Molecule led the team to change the naming system for releases.

Discontinued Sabayon versions included:

Name	Architecture	Desktop environment	Availability
Sabayon GNOME	64 Bit	GNOME 3	DAILY and stable
Sabayon KDE	64 Bit	KDE	DAILY and stable
Sabayon LXDE	64 Bit	LXDE	No longer developed
Sabayon XFCE	64 Bit	Xfce	DAILY and stable
Sabayon MATE	64 Bit	MATE	DAILY and stable
Sabayon Minimal	64 Bit	None	DAILY and stable

Derivatives

Name	Desktop environment	Availability
Sabayon Forensics	Xfce	DAILY

Name	Architecture	Desktop environment	Availability
Sabayon for ARM	ARM	Kodi Media Manager	MONTHLY

Additional X window managers could also be installed from the Sabayon repositories, such as Cinnamon and Razor-qt.

== Configuration ==
Sabayon used the same core components as the Gentoo Linux distribution and used systemd. All of the Gentoo configuration tools, such as etc-update and eselect were fully functional. Sabayon also included additional tools for automatic configuration of various system components such as OpenGL. Sabayon provided proprietary video drivers for both nVidia and ATI hardware. These are enabled if compatible hardware is found; otherwise, the default open-source drivers are used. Because of the automatic driver configuration, the compositing window manager Compiz Fusion and KWin were used for the GNOME and KDE editions, respectively. The discovery and configuration of network cards, wireless cards, and webcams was similarly automatic. Most printers were detected automatically but required specific manual configuration through the CUPS interface.

== Package management ==
Sabayon Linux relied on two package managers. Portage was inherited from Gentoo, while Entropy was developed for Sabayon by Fabio Erculiani and others. Portage downloaded source-code and compiled it specifically for the target system, whereas Entropy managed binary files from servers. The binary tarball packages were precompiled using the Gentoo Linux unstable tree. Entropy clients then pulled these tarballs and performed the various post- and pre-compilation calls of the Gentoo ebuild to set up a package correctly. This means the system was completely binary-compatible with a Gentoo system using the same build configuration. The adoption of two package managers allowed expert users to access the full flexibility of the Gentoo system and others to easily and quickly manage software applications and updates. The Entropy software featured the ability of allowing users to help generate relevant content by voting and by attaching images, files and web links to a package.

The Rigo application browser was a GUI front-end to Entropy that was the successor to Sulfur (aka Entropy Store). Taking on a "less is more" approach, Rigo was designed to be simple and fast. During an interview with Fabio Erculiani he described Rigo as a ”Google-like” Applications Management UI. Rigo handled system updates, package searching, install/removal of packages, up/down voting of packages, and many other common Entropy tasks.

== Applications ==
The number of applications installed by default was higher for DVD editions than for editions small enough to fit on a CD. Their selection was also tailored to the choice between GNOME, KDE, Xfce, and MATE. The XBMC environment could be run without loading the full desktop environment.

The following table summarizes the software included in GNOME, KDE, Xfce, and MATE versions:

Type of Program	GNOME Version	KDE Version	Xfce Version	MATE Version
BitTorrent Client	Transmission	–	Transmission	
E-mail Client	Evolution	KMail	–	–
IRC Client	HexChat	Konversation	HexChat	
Compositing window manager	Mutter	KWin	Xfwm	Marco
Drop down terminal	Guake	Yakuake	–	–
Text editor	gedit	KWrite	Leafpad	Pluma
Image processing	GIMP	–	GIMP	–
Archive tool	Archive Manager	Ark	Archive Manager	Engrampa
Photo manager	Shotwell	Gwenview	Shotwell	Eye of MATE
Browser	Chromium		Midori	
Burning program	Brasero	K3b	–	–
Media Center	Kodi		–	–
Media player	Totem	VLC media player	Totem	–
Instant messaging	Empathy	Kopete	Pidgin	–
Network Manager	NM Applet	KNetworkManager	NM Applet	NM Applet
Music Player	Exaile	Amarok	Exaile	Audacious
Office suite	LibreOffice			–
Virtual terminal	GNOME Terminal	Konsole	Terminal	MATE Terminal
Portable Document Format viewer	Evince	Okular	ePDFView	Atril

Considerable software was also available in the main repository.

Many Microsoft Windows executables were automatically run in Wine.

Other applications included Adobe Reader, Audacity, Clementine, aMSN, Celestia, Eclipse, FileZilla, GnuCash, Google Earth, Inkscape, Kdenlive, Mozilla Firefox, Mozilla Sunbird, Mozilla Thunderbird, Nero Burning ROM, Opera, Picasa, Skype, TeamViewer, VirtualBox, Vuze and Wireshark.

Games (open-source and proprietary) included Doom 3, Eternal Lands, Nexuiz, OpenArena, Quake, Quake 2, Quake 3, Quake 4, Sauerbraten, The Battle for Wesnoth, Tremulous, Unreal, Unreal Tournament, Urban Terror, Vendetta Online, Warsow, Warzone 2100, Wolfenstein: Enemy Territory, World of Padman and Xonotic.

== Installation ==
Gentoo's installation was generally not recommended for beginners because its package management system required users to compile source code to install packages (most distributions rely on precompiled binaries). Compiling larger programs and the base operating system could take several hours. Sabayon was considered easier to install than "pure Gentoo" because it used both the Portage package management system and its own Entropy package management, which allowed the user the option of using precompiled binary files during installation.

Although the distribution was a LiveDVD (or a LiveCD for LXDE, CoreCDX, SpinBase and ServerBase) it could be installed on a hard disk once the system was fully booted. Sabayon Linux used the Calamares installer. In previous releases, Anaconda and the Gentoo Linux Installer were used. Installation was designed to be simpler than is typical for Gentoo, which required more extensive knowledge of the operating system (particularly for the compilation of the Linux kernel). Installation took up to 30 minutes depending on the speed of the DVD drive. Those without a DVD drive could install the GNOME and KDE versions through a USB drive, which could be created with Unetbootin. A program played music during the boot process.

== System requirements ==
- i686-compatible processor (ex. Intel Pentium II, Pentium III, Celeron, AMD Athlon, AMD Duron)
- 512 MB of RAM (1 GB recommended)
- OpenGL capable 3D graphics card (mostly Nvidia, ATI (brand), Intel GMA, VIA Technologies)
- Display Data Channel capable Monitor
- Mouse and Keyboard
- DVD Drive or USB flash drive for installation
- Internet Connection Recommended
- Minimum of 12 GB of free hard disk space for KDE and GNOME. Minimum of 5 GB for the others. Recommended at least 40 GB for KDE or GNOME installations, and 15 GB for the others.

== Releases ==
Version	Desktop environment	Release date	Notes
3.0RC1b	miniEdition	1 July 2006	
3.0RC2		16 August 2006	Distribution name switch from RR4 to Sabayon
3.0RC2	miniEdition	24 August 2006	
3.0		14 September 2006	
3.0	miniEdition	26 September 2006	
3.05	miniEdition	4 October 2006	
3.1		10 October 2006	
3.1	miniEdition	9 October 2006	
3.2		27 November 2006	
3.2	miniEdition	11 December 2006	
3.25		2 January 2007	
3.26		8 January 2007	
3.3		16 March 2007	
3.3	miniEdition	25 March 2007	
3.4 Loop 1		13 April 2007	
3.4 Loop 2		18 May 2007	
3.4 Loop 3		26 June 2007	
1.0 "Business Edition" RE		15 July 2007	
3.4		24 July 2007	
3.4 Revision E		6 August 2007	
3.4	miniEdition	23 September 2007	
3.4 Revision F		7 September 2007	
1.1	Professional Edition	23 October 2007	
3.5 Loop 1		24 December 2007	First release including Entropy
3.5 Loop 2		17 March 2008	
3.5 Loop 3		15 May 2008	
3.5		1 July 2008	First stable release including entropy
Pod 3.5		11 July 2008	
3.5.1		9 November 2008	
4 Revision 1		25 December 2008	
4	LiteMCE	4 January 2009	
4.1	GNOME	13 April 2009	KDE and GNOME versions split off. ISO size changes from 4.7GB to 1.5-2GB.
4.1	KDE	29 April 2009	
4.2	GNOME	30 June 2009	
4.2	KDE	6 July 2009	
coreCD 4.2		25 July 2009	
5.0	GNOME/KDE	2 October 2009	
5.1	GNOME/KDE	12 December 2009	
CoreCD 5.1		20 December 2009	
5.1	x86 GAMING EDITION	25 December 2009	Special Christmas versions containing only games
5.2	GNOME/KDE	26 March 2010	
5.3	GNOME/KDE	5 June 2010	
5.3	SpinBase	18 June 2010	Replaces the CoreCD
5.3	CoreCDX	18 June 2010	CoreCD with X and Fluxbox
5.3	LXDE/Xfce	19 July 2010	First stable version featuring LXDE/Xfce
5.3	SpinBase/OpenVZ Templates	19 July 2010	First stable version featuring ready to use OpenVZ templates
5.4	GNOME/KDE	30 September 2010	
5.5	GNOME/KDE	27 January 2011	
6	GNOME/KDE	23 June 2011	
7	GNOME/KDE/Xfce	11 October 2011	
8	GNOME/KDE/Xfce	7 February 2012	
9	GNOME/KDE/Xfce	8 June 2012	
10	GNOME/KDE/Xfce/MATE	13 September 2012	First stable version featuring a MATE edition
11	GNOME/KDE/Xfce/MATE	15 February 2013	
13.04	GNOME/KDE/Xfce/MATE	30 April 2013	
13.08	GNOME/KDE/Xfce/MATE	12 August 2013	systemd adopted as default init system, GNOME 3.8
14.01	Gnome/KDE/Xfce/Mate	20 December 2013	Big Steam, Parallel Entropy, Long Term Stable versions
16.07	Gnome/KDE/Xfce/Mate	28 June 2016	Alpha Stage of LXQt spin, Anaconda installer, Rolling Release versions
16.11	Gnome/KDE/Xfce/Mate/Fluxbox	28 October 2016	New Anaconda version, kernel 4.8, Latest KDE-Plasma version, New Greeter!, Improvements and fixes to Entropy, New supported ARM devices!, Also new website, Rolling Release versions extra. Desktop, Server, and Cloud versions available
19.03 DESKTOP	Gnome/KDE/Xfce/Mate/Fluxbox	21 January 2018	Unknown Changes
19.03 SERVER	Minimal Install	21 January 2018	Unknown Changes
19.03 CLOUD	DockerHub/VagrantImage/(LXD/LXC)	21 January 2018	Unknown Changes

== Reception ==
Tux Machines reviewed Sabayon Linux in 2005 and wrote:

The system starts out really impressive. I booted the livedvd and was given the option of just hitting enter or perusing several booting options. Then the silent boot features a lovely splash that utilizes a kde-like progress of highlighting icons rather than a progress bar and all accented by the lovely gentoo purple color scheme. The verbose boot looks just like my everyday gentoo system booting – a variation on the regular linux boot you've all probably seen many many times. A beautiful desktop greets you and lulls you into a sense of confidence. The desktop appears so polished and refined. The menus are chocked [sic] full of useful applications and tools. The fonts are great looking and performance is amazing (considering it appears built for i386). It features a 2.6.14-r2 kernel and uses a 6.99 of Xorg. The crowning jewel is the installer. It's the whole point.

Dedoimedo wrote in a 2008 review that:

Sabayon aims at delivering the complete experience out of the box. This means a plethora of programs, audio and video codecs and the sexy Compiz 3D desktop effects. It is also fully compatible with Gentoo, allowing the power users the ability to squeeze the absolute maximum of their operating system.

Linux.com wrote a review about Sabayon 3.4, saying:

All the options take a relatively long time to boot – approximately three minutes on my system. During boot, startup music begins playing during the last stages, unless you choose the Start without Music boot option. After the boot process, the first screen to appear will be the Configure Accelerated Desktop options. Sabayon loaded my Nvidia drivers, but neither Compiz Fusion or Metisse would work properly on my machines. I also had trouble shutting down or rebooting Sabayon; it would hang more times than not.

LWN.net reviewed Sabayon 4.0x saying:

Sabayon Linux 4 sports a tasteful new theme that starts at first boot and is consistent throughout. Gone are the gothic tones of 2.x and the gawdy bright blue of 3.x. The professional quality graphics feature gray tones with royal blue accents and is very easy on the eyes. This new theme reflects the maturity of the distribution and its developers.

DistroWatch Weekly reviewed Sabayon Linux in 2009, stating:

The installer is simple and easy-to-use. However, I did have some issues with the partitioner. Having just installed a new hard drive, I needed to set up partitions and thought I'd use the Sabayon installer for that. If memory serves, Sabayon adapted portions of Anaconda for their installer several version back and I thought it would be up to the job. Depending upon your perspective, it may have been. The issue I had with it was its insistence that it knew better than me how to arrange my partitions. I kid you not. I'd set up a few partitions in the order and size I wanted, and then they would just mysteriously rearrange themselves to meet some developer's idea of how they should be ordered. And it would not allow me to set up some unused partitions. It insisted they all have names and filesystems. I messed with it for a while but finally gave up and fired up fdisk. The install proceeded without incident after that. I chose to use the Ext4 filesystem and installed all software. There isn't a complete individual package selection, but broad categories and a few optional packages are listed one can disable. One can set up user accounts and a root password is desired, even though by default the first user account will be set up as the administrator. The GRUB bootloader will be installed if and where you wish and it'll try to detect and include other systems. That part is a bit hit and miss, but most are.

LinuxBSDos wrote a review in 2009. Its review of Sabayon 5, stated that:

In Nautilus, the file manager, clicking on an image file opens the file in the GNU Image Manipulation Program (GIMP). I think when most people click on an image file, they want to view it in a photo viewer, and not in a Photoshop-like application. Note that this seems to be the default configuration of the GNOME desktop environment, and not a Sabayon-specific issue. I made a similar observation in a review of Hymera Open.
