= Movial =

- Type: Private
- Headquarters: Helsinki, Finland
- Key people: Lauri Vilamo (executive chairman)
- Number of employees: 100+
- Website: www.movial.com

Movial is a privately held software engineering company focused on Internet enabled devices in consumer electronics and telecommunications industries. The company’s services include device concept and user interface (UI) design, third-party application, service and platform integration, and consulting.

The company was founded in Helsinki, Finland in 2001 by Lauri Vilamo, Jari Ala-Ruona and Jon Molander. The company is known for having created Scratchbox, a cross-compilation toolkit intended to make embedded Linux application development easier. The company is also known for contributing their Browser D-Bus Bridge code, which allows developers to build widgets that can incorporate phone capabilities such as instant messaging and audio to the open-source community. In 2008, the company was recognized by the Linux Foundation for being one of the key contributors to the Linux kernel.

The company is also a member of the GSMA's RCS and VoLTE (Voice over LTE) initiative.

== Company ==
The company's products include an SIP/IMS (RCS and MMTel) application for device manufacturers and service providers, and a white label toolkit and web runtime environment for Linux devices. Movial's products can be used in PCs, mobile phones, netbooks, laptops, in-car entertainment systems, and more.

Movial customers and partners include Adobe, ARM and BMW. The company claims it has the most commercial deployments of PC IMS clients in the world

== History ==
Movial participated in creating the first mobile Linux device in the world. The company was formed in 2001 in Helsinki, Finland, and in 2003 became the first company in the world to cross-compile GTK for an embedded device with touch screen.

In 2004 Movial launched Push-to-video Phone, IM, and Video Camera in on Nokia's first S60 phone, followed by Communicator client products for PC and Consumer Electronics the following year. Movial joined LiPS Forum in 2006 and helped launch the COnverged MEssaging Technology (COMET) consortium. It also provided an IMS Client to Trolltech's Greenphone for 3GSM World Congress 2006.

In 2007 Movial was selected by ARM to create a free and open-source platform for next-gen mobile applications. Movial joined GSMA’s RCS program, LiMo and Khronos Group in 2008, the same year that Movial IXS Application Suite launched on Texas Instruments OMAP3 Platform.

Movial launched Social Communicator at Demo '08, shortly before Optimus in Portugal "PC-Enables" all mobile phone subscriptions with Movial Communicator. In 2009 Movial announced support for Qualcomm's Snapdragon chipset and that it would integrate, test, and certify Adobe Flash technology in embedded mobile environments that utilize ARM-based Linux under the Open Screen Project. The following year it launched a new cross platform Movial IXS Browser running on QtWebKit, which enabled developers to deploy and port touchscreen optimized User Interface code across any device.

In 2009, Movial expanded to Romania, United States and Taiwan. In July 2020, it was reported that Microsoft had acquired 60 employees from Movial's Romanian division and took ownership of its offices there. The employees will work on Android-based products for Microsoft Devices.

== Partners ==
- VAISALA
- Schneider Electric and Fire
- Hitachi
- Adobe Systems
- Alcatel-Lucent
- ARM Holdings
- Colibria
- Ericsson
- Global IP Sound
- Qt (framework)
- Qualcomm
- Texas Instruments
- Nexstim
