= Noville =

Noville may refer to:

- Noville, Bastogne, a village in Bastogne, Luxembourg province, Wallonia, Belgium
- Noville, Liège, a village in Fexhe-le-Haut-Clocher, Liège province, Wallonia, Belgium
- Noville-les-Bois, a village in Fernelmont, Namur province, Wallonia, Belgium
- Noville-sur-Mehaigne, a village in Éghezée, Namur province, Wallonia, Belgium
- Noville, Switzerland, a municipality of the canton of Vaud, Switzerland

== People with the surname ==
- George Otto Noville (1890–1963), American aviation pioneer
