= Daniel Robbins (computer programmer) =

American computer programmer

- Born: Montreal, Quebec, Canada
- Education: Worcester Polytechnic Institute
- Organization: Funtoo Technologies
- Known for: Free software, Hacker, Gentoo, Funtoo
- Website: www.funtoo.org

Daniel Robbins is a computer programmer who founded the Gentoo Linux project and was its former chief architect. In 2008, he launched the Funtoo project, a free Linux distribution based on Gentoo, and he became the project's lead developer and organizer. He works in Albuquerque, New Mexico at Zenoss, and as president for Funtoo Technologies.

== Biography ==
=== Formation of Gentoo Linux distribution ===
During his time as a system administrator at the University of New Mexico in Albuquerque, Robbins formed his own distribution Enoch Linux, which was later renamed Gentoo Linux in 2002.

Gentoo struggled to create a business model that would support its key developers, like many other free software projects at the time. Robbins resigned as chief architect in April 2004. He formed the Gentoo Foundation and transferred all Gentoo intellectual property to it, so that Gentoo would be run as a full community-based model. He rejoined the project for a short time from August 2006, becoming a developer again in February 2007 and joining the amd64 team but resigned in early March 2007.

There have been several high-profile criticisms of the way Gentoo has run since Robbins left, such as: "...since the resignation of Gentoo's founder and benevolent dictator from the project in 2004, the newly established Gentoo Foundation has been battling with lack of clear directions and frequent developer conflicts...".

In mid-July 2007, it emerged that Robbins was still technically the legal president of the Gentoo Foundation.

==== Funtoo Linux ====
In 2008, Robbins began to work on Funtoo, a project created to allow him to work on extending the technologies originally created for Gentoo.

In 2024, Robbins announced that he would shut down Funtoo without searching a handover.

==== Microsoft ====
Robbins' move to Microsoft, in May 2005, attracted attention within the Linux community, which has historically had a combative relationship with Microsoft. He described his role working for Bill Hilf as "...helping Microsoft to understand Open Source and community-based projects..."

However, Robbins resigned less than a year later in January 2006 due to frustrations that he was unable to fully utilize his technical skills in this position.

==== RTLinux ====
Later in 2006, he joined FSMLabs in Socorro, New Mexico, to work on RTLinux.

=== Funtoo Technologies ===
Daniel Robbins is also president of Funtoo Technologies, a consulting firm founded in 2006 and located in Albuquerque, New Mexico.
