= Dasgupta =

Bengali surname

- Pronunciation: [ˈdaʃɡupto]
- Language: Bengali

Origin
- Region of origin: Bengal

Other names
- Variant forms: Gupta, Sengupta, Duttagupta, Kargupta, Debgupta

Dasgupta (pronounced [ˈdaʃɡupto]) (Bengali: দাশগুপ্ত) is a common Bengali surname that is used by the Bengali Hindus of West Bengal, Assam, Tripura and Bangladesh. The surname is found among the members of the Baidya caste of Bengal.

== Geographical distribution ==
As of 2014, 62.2% of all known bearers of the surname Dasgupta were residents of India and 28.9% were residents of Bangladesh. In India, the frequency of the surname was higher than national average in the following states and union territories:

1. West Bengal (1: 2,387)
2. Tripura (1: 6,243)
3. Arunachal Pradesh (1: 15,711)
4. Delhi (1: 16,187)
5. Daman and Diu (1: 18,685)
6. Assam (1: 21,393)

== Notable people ==
=== A ===
- Aloke Dasgupta, sitar player
- Alokeranjan Dasgupta, Bengali poet
- Amiya Kumar Dasgupta, Indian economist
- Asim Dasgupta (also known as Dr. Asim Kumar Dasgupta), West Bengal Ex Finance and Excise Minister.

=== B ===
- Basudeb Dasgupta, Bengali novelist and short-story writer
- Benu Dasgupta, cricketer
- Bijon Dasgupta, Art Director
- Biplab Dasgupta, Marxist economist
- Birsa Dasgupta, film director
- Buddhadeb Dasgupta (1944–2021), Indian filmmaker and poet
- Buddhadev Das Gupta (1933–2018), Indian classical musician who played the sarod

=== C ===
- Chandan Dasgupta, Indian theoretical physicist
- Chidananda Dasgupta (1921–2011), filmmaker, film critic and historian

=== D ===
- Deep Dasgupta, cricketer

=== G ===
- Gurudas Dasgupta (born 1936), senior trade-union leader, Communist Party of India, and Member of Parliament

=== H ===
- Hem Chandra Dasgupta, geologist

=== I ===
- Indraadip Dasgupta, music composer
- Indrani Dasgupta, Indian Supermodel.

=== J ===
- Jishu Dasgupta, Bengali actor
- Jnanendra Das Gupta, Indo-Swedish chemist

=== K ===
- Kankar Shubra Dasgupta, scientist and academic
- Kamal Dasgupta, Bengali music director
- Khagendra Nath Dasgupta, Independence activist
- Kurchi Dasgupta, painter and writer
- Kinshuk Dasgupta, Scientist and Shanti Swarup Bhatnagar Awardee

=== M ===
- Mahananda Dasgupta, experimental physicist

=== N ===
- Nairanjana Dasgupta, statistician
- Nilanjana Dasgupta, social psychologist

=== P ===
- Partha Dasgupta, economist
- Piyush Dasgupta, academic, political activist
- Poonam Dasgupta, actress
- Prabuddha Dasgupta, photographer
- Pratim Dasgupta, film director
- Probal Dasgupta (1953–2026), linguist, Esperantist and academic administrator
- Prokar Dasgupta, urologist
- Purnendu Dasgupta, Indian-American academic

=== R ===
- Rabindra Kumar Das Gupta, scholar
- Rana Dasgupta, British-Indian writer
- Renuka Dasgupta, Bengali singer
- Roma Dasgupta (Suchitra Sen before marriage), Indian actress

=== S ===
- Sailen Dasgupta, politician
- Samit Dasgupta, mathematician
- Sanjoy Dasgupta, computer scientist
- Sayantani DasGupta, Indian-American physician
- Shamik Dasgupta, comic book writer
- Shamita Das Dasgupta, social activist
- Shashibhusan Dasgupta, Bengali scholar in philosophy, languages and literature
- Somnath Dasgupta, academic and geologist
- Sudhangshu Dasgupta, CPI(M) politician
- Sudhin Dasgupta, Bengali music director
- Surendranath Dasgupta, Sanskrit scholar and philosopher
- Sujaya Dasgupta, actress
- Swagatalakshmi Dasgupta, singer
- Swapan Dasgupta, Indian journalist, MP, Politician

=== T ===
- Tanusri Saha-Dasgupta, Indian physicist

=== U ===
- Uma Dasgupta, Indian actress

=== Y ===
- Yash Dasgupta, actor and model
