= Sengupta =

- Pronunciation: [ʃenɡupto]
- Language: Bengali

Origin
- Region of origin: Bengal region of India and Bangladesh

Other names
- Variant forms: Gupta, Dasgupta, Duttagupta, Kargupta, Debgupta

Sengupta (Bengali: সেনগুপ্ত) is a surname found among the Bengalis of West Bengal, Assam, Tripura and Bangladesh. They belong to the Baidya caste of Bengal. The surname is a compound of Sen and Gupta.

== Notables ==
- Achintyakumar Sengupta (1903–1976), Bengali author
- Aditya Vikram Sengupta (born 1983), Indian film director, cinematographer and graphic designer
- Ambar Sengupta, mathematician
- Anasuya Sengupta (poet) (born 1974), Indian poet, author, activist
- Anasuya Sengupta (born 1980), Indian actress, production designer
- Anita Sengupta, British-born American aerospace engineer
- Anup Sengupta, Bengali film director and producer
- Apoorva Sengupta (1939–2013), Indian cricketer
- Arjun Kumar Sengupta (1937–2010), Indian politician and Member of the Parliament of India
- Arunabha Sengupta (born 1973), Indian novelist
- Atiha Sen Gupta (born 1988), British playwright and screenwriter
- Barkha Sengupta (born 1979), Indian television and film actress
- Barun Sengupta (1934–2008), Bengali journalist and founder-editor of Bartaman newspaper
- Biswatosh Sengupta (born 1944), Indian academic from Kolkata
- Bonny Sengupta, Indian Bengali film actor
- Bratin Sengupta (born 1963), Indian politician
- Deep Sengupta (born 1988), Indian chess grandmaster
- Dipankar Sengupta Dipon, Bangladeshi film director
- Gurunath Sengupta (1848–1914), Sanskrit scholar from the Jessore District of Bangladesh
- Hindol Sengupta, (born 1979), Indian historian and journalist
- Hiranmay Sen Gupta (born 1934), Bangladeshi nuclear physicist
- Indraneil Sengupta, Indian model and actor
- Jatindra Mohan Sengupta (1885–1933), Indian revolutionary, President of then Bengal Provincial Congress Committee and Bengal Swaraj Party
- Jatindranath Sengupta (1887–1954), Bengali poet and writer
- Jisshu Sengupta, also known as Jisshu, Bengali film actor
- Joy Sengupta (born 1968), Indian film and stage actor
- Joya Sengupta, Bangladesh Awami League politician, doctor
- Kalyan Jyoti Sengupta (born 1953), Indian lawyer, Chief Justice of Andhra Pradesh High Court
- Krishnendu Sengupta (born 1970), Indian professor of theoretical physics
- Mallika Sengupta (1960–2011), Bengali poet, feminist, and reader of Sociology from Kolkata
- Mihir Sengupta, Bengali Indian writer
- Moinak Sengupta (born 1973), Indian cricketer
- N. C. Sen Gupta, the eleventh Governor of the Reserve Bank of India from 19 May to 19 August 1975
- Narendra Nath Sen Gupta (1889–1944), Indian psychologist, philosopher, and professor
- Nares Chandra Sen-Gupta (1882–1964), legal scholar and Bengali novelist
- Nellie Sengupta (1886–1973), Englishwoman who fought for Indian Independence
- Nikhil Baran Sengupta (1943–2014), Indian art director of Oriya films
- Niranjan Sen Gupta, Bengali Indian revolutionary
- Nitish Sengupta (1933–2013), Revenue Secretary of the Government of India
- Papiya Sengupta, Indian television actress
- Partho Sen-Gupta (born 1965), Indian-born French independent film director and screenwriter
- Paulami Sengupta, the editor of three magazines in India: Anandamela, Unish Kuri and Career
- Phani Gopal Sen Gupta (born 1905), Indian politician, member of Lok Sabha from Purnia (1952–1970)
- Piya Sengupta (born 1969), Indian film actress, producer, director and writer
- Poile Sengupta (born 1948), Indian writer, playwright and actress
- Prabodh Chandra Sengupta (1876–1962), historian of astronomy in ancient India
- Pramod Ranjan Sengupta (1907–1974), Marxist intellectual and Bengali revolutionary
- Priti Sengupta, Gujarati poet and writer
- Pulak Sengupta (born 1963), Indian petrologist
- Ramananda Sengupta (1916–2017), Indian cinematographer
- Ratnottama Sengupta (born 1955), Indian film journalist, festival curator, and author
- Rituparna Sengupta (born 1971), Indian actress in Bengali and Hindi films
- Rudraprasad Sengupta (born 1935), Bengali Indian actor, director and cultural critic
- Sachin Sengupta (1891–1961), Bengali playwright and theatre producer and director
- Sagar Sengupta (born 1968), Indian immunologist and cancer biologist
- Shantanu Sengupta, Indian cell biologist
- Sohini Sengupta, Indian film and theatre actress
- Somini Sengupta (fl. 2023), American journalist
- Stephanie Sengupta, American producer and writer
- Subodh Chandra Sengupta (1903–1998), Indian academic and critic of English literature, Shakespearean scholar
- Sudipta Sengupta (born 1946), professor in structural geology in Jadavpur University, Calcutta, India
- Sukhamoy Sen Gupta, Chief Minister of Tripura in India from 1972 to 1977
- Suranjit Sengupta (1945–2017), senior Bangladesh Awami League politician
- Swatilekha Sengupta (1950–2021), Bengali actress
- Tarakeswar Sengupta (1905–1931), Indian independence activist
- Upal Sengupta, lead vocalist of Bengali band Chandrabinoo
- Ushoshi Sengupta (born 1988), Indian beauty pageant contestant and winner of Miss India Universe 2010
