= Nilanjana =

Nilanjana (lit. 'lightning' in Sanskrit) may refer to:

== Entertainment ==
- Nilanjana (film), a 2017 Sri Lankan film

== People ==
- Nilanjana Dasgupta, Indian social psychologist
- Nilanjana Roy, Indian author
- Nilanjana Sarkar, Indian singer
- Nilanjana Sengupta, Indian actress and director
- Jhumpa Lahiri, born Nilanjana Sudeshna, Indian-American author

== See also ==
- Nilanjan Chatterjee, Indian biostatistician
