= Fatima Shaik =

Indian-American writer

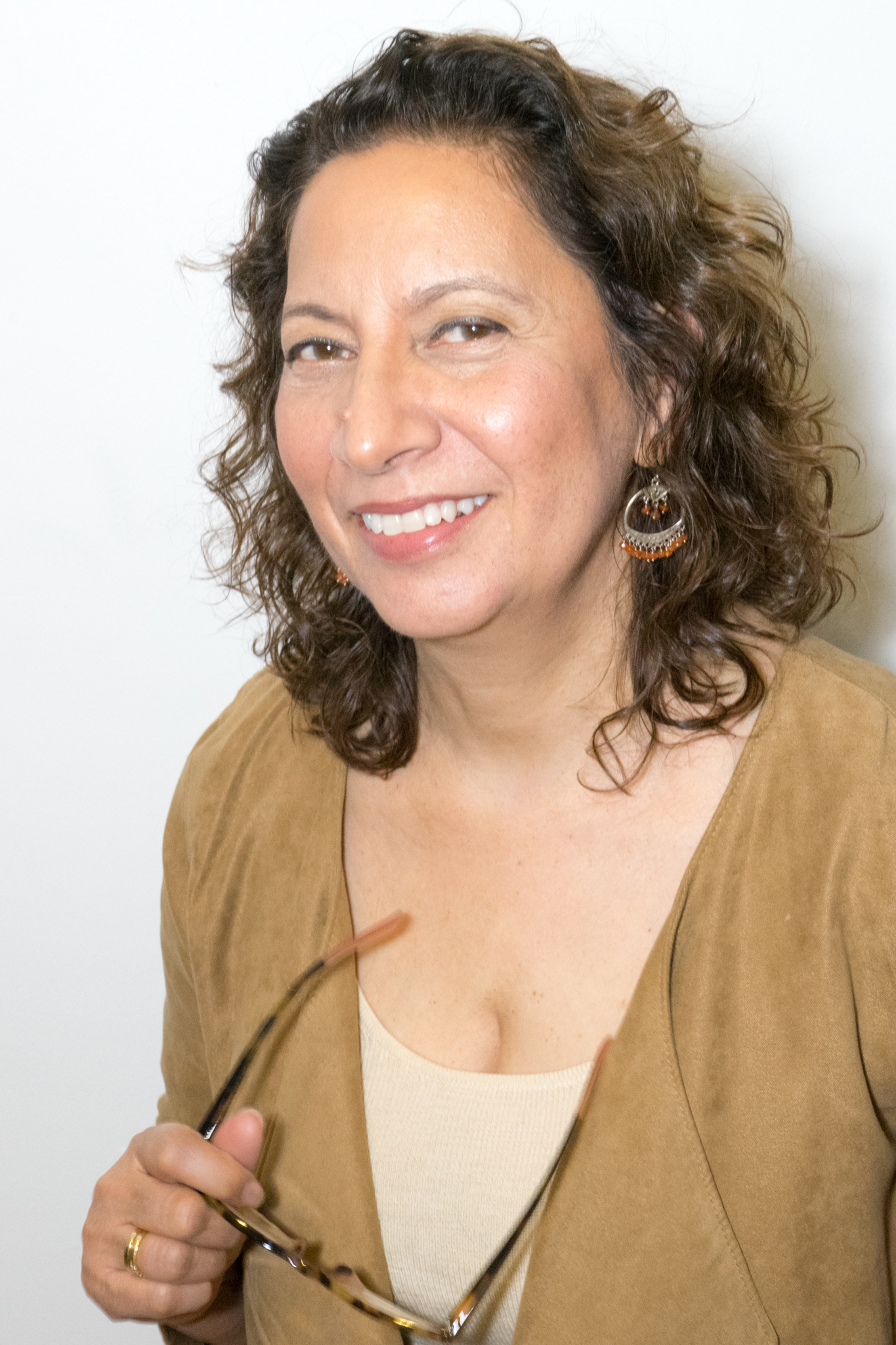
- photo by Sophia Little
- Born: 1952 (age 73–74); New Orleans, Louisiana
- Education: BS, MA
- Alma mater: Boston University, New York University
- Occupation: Writer
- Writing career
- Notable works: Melitte, 1997

Fatima Shaik is an Indian-American and African-American author and former journalist. Her work explores contemporary social issues, especially those related to the "African-American experience."

Shaik's research on the Société d’Economie, an early Black Catholic mutual aid society, received support from the Louisiana Endowment for the Humanities and the Kittredge Fund, and led to her 2021 book Economy Hall: The Hidden History of a Free Black Brotherhood. That same year, she received the Louisiana Writer Award from the Louisiana Center for the Book and the State Library of Louisiana.

Shaik is the subject of a film by director Kaveri Kaul, who takes the author to her paternal grandfather's birthplace in Kolkata. Shaik is included in The Booklover’s Guide to New Orleans and the Encyclopedia of African American Writers.

== Biography ==
=== Early life and education ===
Shaik was born in New Orleans and raised in the Historic Creole 7th Ward. Her father was one of the first black aviators in the state. Her mother was Lily Shaik, a native Louisiana French speaker and poet. Both taught at New Orleans public schools.

Shaik's Bengali grandfather, Shaik Mohamed Musa, immigrated to the United States in the 1890s, settling in Tremé in 1896. Musa was a shopkeeper, who married Shaik's grandmother, a black woman with Creole and other Native American ancestry; Musa died shortly before the birth of their son, Fatima Shaik's father.

Fatima Shaik attended Xavier University of Louisiana for two years before graduating from Boston University with a Bachelor of Science, and New York University with a Master of Arts. She reported for the Miami News and New Orleans Times-Picayune before joining McGraw-Hill and working in editorial positions for a decade. She began teaching at Saint Peter's University in 1991. She served as the first director of the Communications program until 2001. She served as an assistant professor, and retired in 2020. As of 2021, she serves as an adjunct faculty member.

Shaik was the subject of the 2022 documentary The Bengali, which covers her journey to discover her family roots in India.

== Personal life ==
Shaik married the artist James Little in 1984.

== Works ==
=== Essays ===
Fatima Shaik's personal essays reflect feminine, African-American culture in New Orleans. Her essays written for In These Times cover the aftermath of Hurricane Katrina from 2005 to 2015.

==== Narrative histories of Creole New Orleans ====
Among her essays and journal articles on Creole culture in New Orleans are:

- PEN American Center website “Translation, Semantics, and Race” which discussed the subversive political metaphors used by the French-language writing of the black community in the 19th century; The Jazz Archivist “The Economy Society and Community Support for Jazz”

The Louisiana Endowment for the Humanities and Kittredge Fund have supported her work to read and annotate 100 years of bi-weekly journals written by the members of the Société d’Economie et d’Assistance Mutuelle.

=== Fiction ===
==== Short story collections ====
For her work in trade fiction, Shaik has been praised as a writer in “the ranks of black women writers preserving the voice of the Afro-American experience.”

What Went Missing and What Got Found is a lyrical short story collection with undertones of the blues.

Shaik's stories have appeared in the anthologies: African-American Literature; Streetlights: Illuminating Tales of the Urban Black Experience; Breaking Ice: Contemporary African-American Fiction; and in journals: Killens Review of Arts and Letters; Callaloo; and the Southern Review.

==== Children’s and young adult literature ====
Shaik's books for children include Melitte, a historical novel, which was nominated as one of the Best Books for Young Adults by YALSA (1998) and praised by The Horn Book, School Library Journal, and Kirkus. The Jazz of Our Street was “a compact cultural history” according to Kirkus. On Mardi Gras Day was one of the Best Holiday Books of 1999, according to the Bank Street College of Education.

Shaik is the co-chair of the Children's and Young Adult Book Committee for PEN American Center, and has participated in the PEN World Voices Festival of International Literature.

== Awards and honors ==
Shaik received a fellowship from the National Endowment for the Humanities to study Aesthetics and Popular Culture at the University of Chicago in 1981. As an emerging writer, in the fall of 1989, Shaik was named, along with Rita Dove, David Bradley, Mark Mathabane, and Trey Ellis, as one of five writers under 35 who "...will play a significant role in shaping the future of Afro-American literature in the 21st century,” by the Forsythe County Public Library.

Shaik held a literature residency at the New Orleans Public Schools Africana Studies Program in October 2002. She was a Scholar in Residence at New York University in 2004.

She is a member of the board of trustees for PEN American Center and former board member of the Writers Room in New York City.

In 2021, she received the 22nd annual Louisiana Writer Award from the State Library of Louisiana.
