= Single-drop microextraction =

Sample preparation technique

Single-drop microextraction (SDME) is a sample preparation technique in chemical test or analytical chemistry. SDME uses only a single drop of solvent to isolate and preconcentrate analytes from a sample matrix. The extremely low solvent use of SDME makes it cost-effective and less harmful to the environment, subscribing to the principles of green analytical chemistry.

In many chemical test procedures, sample preparation, often the time- and cost-determining step, is designed to isolate analytes from interferences and to provide (typically through enrichment) an analyte concentration suitable for detection. Liquid−liquid extraction (LLE) has long been a widely used technique for the preparation of aqueous samples. Numerous efforts have been made to improve upon the LLE technique for decades.

SDME using only one microdrop of organic solvent to perform LLE was first described in 1996 in Analytical Chemistry. Liu and Dasgupta described a microdrop LLE system with a drop (~1.3 microliter) of chloroform at the tip of a tube suspended in an aqueous drop to perform automatic drop-in-drop extraction and in situ optical detection. Jeannot and Cantwell introduced a method with a single drop (8 microliter) of n-octane at the end of a Teflon rod in a stirred aqueous sample solution to extract the analyte into the organic drop for GC analysis. Since its introduction, SDME has become a popular LLE technique because it is inexpensive, easy to operate, and uses only minuscule amount of solvent.
