= Sayantani =

Sayantani is a given name. People with the name include:

- Sayantani Ghosh (born 1983), Indian television actress
- Sayantani DasGupta (born 1970), American novelist
