= Anasuya Sengupta =

Anasuya Sengupta may refer to:

- Anasuya Sengupta (poet), Indian poet, author and activist
- Anasuya Sengupta (actress), Indian actress and production designer
