= Kaveri Kaul =

American filmmaker

- Born: October 19, 1952 (age 73); Kolkata, India
- Education: Harvard University
- Occupations: Film Director, Producer
- Website: kaverykaul.com

Kaveri Kaul, formerly known as Kavery Dutta, is a Kolkata-born, American filmmaker and founder of the production company, Riverfilms. Her directing and producing credits include Back Walking Forward, Long Way from Home, Cuban Canvas, One Hand Don’t Clap, and First Look.

== Early life and education ==
Kavery Kaul (Bengali: কাবেরি) (born Kavery Dutta) was born on October 19, 1952 in Kolkata, India. She immigrated to the United States at age five with her family. Her mother Kanak Dutta was a history teacher, and her father M. Jan Dutta was an economist.

Kaul attended Friends’ Central School near Philadelphia and Rutgers Preparatory School in Somerset, New Jersey. She received her bachelor's degree in English literature from Harvard University, where, as an English major, she discovered the poetry of Sonia Sanchez. According to Kaul, while she was a student at Harvard, "I heard that a new and unusual course on the films of the Indian director Satyajit Ray was being offered by an Englishman on the faculty. How could I not be inspired by Ray’s nuanced stories of the human experience in the face of overwhelming social and economic forces?"

== Career ==
Before setting out as a director, Kaul headed for Paris in 1973, finding France to be a fertile middle ground where she lived for two years. There, she learned the craft of editing at Scopcolor, a documentary production house launched by the French television journalist Roger Louis when he was fired by ORTF, the official French radio and television office, after the political unrest of May, 1968.

Kaul returned to New York City to continue her work as an editor on films including Robert Richter’s Vietnam: An American Journey and Peter Schnall’s The Real Thing. “If you know how to put a story together in the end, you know what to look for when you’re filming. Editing teaches directing,” she once said.

She launched her filmmaking career as producer and director of the documentary First Look. Filmed in Cuba and the U.S., it captures the first cultural exchange between the two countries since the Cuban Revolution when visiting artists Eduardo "Choco" Roca and Nelson Dominguez meet the American art world and a curious American public.

Her other directing credits include Back Walking Forward, about one family's search for a new normal after their son's traumatic brain injury; Long Way from Home, an intimate look at three teenage girls in their first encounter with differences of race and class at “top” schools; One Hand Don’t Clap, Calypso (and Soca) music from Brooklyn to the Trinidad and Tobago Carnival, through the eyes of Grandmaster Lord Kitchener and the groundbreaking Calypso Rose; Wild at Art, a portrait of Philippines-born Washington painter Pacita Abad; and Cuban Canvas, a story of artists in Havana in 2018, which was commissioned by The Kennedy Center for the festival, Artes de Cuba: From the Island to the World.

Kaul has taught as an adjunct professor at Columbia University, City College of New York (CCNY) and School of Visual Arts (SVA NYC).

=== The Bengali (2021) ===
In 2021, Kaul released the documentary The Bengali, which follows Fatima Shaik as she travels to India to discover more about the history of her family. Kaul had first met Shaik at the Writers' Room, a New York business that rented desk space, where they bonded over their shared heritage, and then reunited nearly ten years later while living nearby to each other. Kaul then spent two years conducting research with records, stories and other documentation, which led to a Fulbright-Nehru senior research fellowship for Kaul to fund the film, which was initially titled Streetcar to Kolkata.

== Other work ==
Kaul has always questioned who tells the story and whose voice is heard --- on or off screen. She was one of the first South Asians to serve on the Selection Committee of the Asian American International Film Festival (AIFF). She served on the Jury for the Mahindra Indo-American Arts Council (MIAAC) Film Festival. She is a co-founder of Manavi, the first organization created to stop violence against South Asian women in the U.S. Kaul is author of the articles “Of Slumdogs and Loveleen” for Women's Media Center, “Family Values” in A. Magazine, and “Cinema in India” in Filmmakers Newsletter. Her TEDx Talk addressed the importance of stories that connect people.

== Awards and honors ==
Kaul's honors include: Fulbright Scholar, Logan Nonfiction Fellowship, and is the recipient of a New York Foundation for the Arts Fellowship. Her films have screened at the Telluride Film Festival, London Film Festival, Rotterdam Film Festival, Film Festival of India, FESPACO (Burkina Faso), DOC NYC, Havana Film Festival New York, Margaret Mead Film Festival, Trinidad and Tobago Film Festival. Her documentaries have been shown in theaters and on television, in the U.S. and internationally. They have been featured at distinguished venues including: National Museum of Women in the Arts, The Kennedy Center, Whitney Museum of American Art, High Museum of Art, and Cleveland Museum of Art. Her work has received the support of the National Endowment for the Arts, the Best Cultural Film Award (Havana), and a Proclamation of Excellence from New York City.

== Filmography ==
- 1988 First Look (Documentary – director, producer)
- 1991 One Hand Don’t Clap (Documentary – director, producer, editor)
- ???? Soul Gone Home (Fiction – director, producer)
- 1995 Wild at Art (Documentary – director, producer)
- 2006 Long Way from Home (Documentary – director, producer)
- 2011 Back Walking Forward (Documentary – director, producer)
- 2018 Cuban Canvas (Documentary – director, producer)
- 2021 The Bengali (Documentary)
