= Amit Chakrabarti =

American physicist (born 1959)

- Born: November 11, 1959 (age 66); Calcutta, India
- Education: University of Minnesota; University of Calcutta
- Known for: Contributions to chemical physics and condensed matter physics
- Scientific career
- Fields: Condensed matter physics Soft matter physics
- Workplaces: Kansas State University
- Doctoral advisor: Chandan Dasgupta

Amit Chakrabarti (born November 11, 1959) is the former William and Joan Porter Chair in Physics at Kansas State University. He currently serves as the dean of the college of arts and sciences at Kansas State University.

Chakrabarti is a theoretical physicist with interests in soft matter and statistical physics. He has worked on diverse soft matter systems, including liquid mixtures, polymers, liquid crystals, aerosols, colloids, nanoparticles, and most recently, self-assembly of proteins.

== Biography ==
Chakrabarti was born in Calcutta, India. He earned his Bachelor of Science in physics in 1979 and Master of Science in physics in 1982 from the University of Calcutta, and earned his doctorate in physics from the University of Minnesota in 1987. He was a research associate at Temple University from 1987 to 1988 and at Lehigh University from 1988 to 1989.

Chakrabarti joined the physics department at Kansas State University in 1990 and was named a full professor in 2000. He served as interim head of the department of physics from 2006 to 2007. In July 2011, Chakrabarti was named the William and Joan Porter Chair in Physics.

== Academics and research ==
Chakrabarti's research focuses on how particles in a dispersed phase come together and form aggregates. His individual and collaborative research projects have received extramural funding from agencies such as NASA and the National Science Foundation. He has published more than 150 peer-reviewed papers and mentored nine doctoral students and several postdoctoral fellows.

Chakrabarti and co-workers' numerical work in the late 1980s settled a long-standing controversy on the value of domain growth exponent in quenched far from equilibrium systems. He carried out large-scale simulations of conformations of grafted chains that prompted several detailed experiments on this subject. He is a co-author of the first simulation work on how selective surface interactions influence spinodal decomposition in a mixture. This paper led to a flurry of experimental activities and confirmation of his groups' theoretical findings.

His work on phase separation in fluids with long-chain molecules explained why different experiments carried out to different time regimes seem to produce contradictory results. His group's large-scale simulation on aggregation kinetics in dense particulate systems explained Christopher Sorensen's research group's experimental observation of speed up in the kinetics of aggregation in a dense system and developed the concept of cluster crowding in aggregating systems. Chakrabarti and Christopher Sorensen, Cortelyou-Rust University Distinguished Professor of physics at Kansas State University, have published a recent invited review that provides a comprehensive description of their research of how a system of particles evolves from a dilute sol to a gel. This paper identifies new regimes of aggregation.

His research group has developed a phenomenological model for interactions among ligated gold nanoparticles based on a model of grafted polymer chains. This work successfully explained Christopher Sorensen's research group's experimentally observed values for the superlattice constants for gold nanoparticles decorated with various ligands and the trend in solubility of nanoparticles seen in experiments.

Chakrabarti's research group is currently carrying out simulation study of nanoparticle supercluster nucleation. Analysis of a pre-nucleation induction period yielded a supercluster interfacial tensions that compare reasonably well with other theory and Christopher Sorensen's research group's experiments. This work also suggests that the nucleation process for ligated nanoparticles is a two-step process as seen in some protein nucleation studies.

In collaboration with James Gunton, professor of physics at Lehigh University, one of Chakrabarti's recent projects focuses on understanding how insulin crystals form from aqueous solutions. . His other recent work is on self-assembly of amelogenin bio-macromolecules. Amelogenin is involved in the mineral deposition and has been postulated to fulfill major structural roles during highly organized ribbonlike carbonated apatite crystal formation in enamel development, which is an unusual case in biomineralization. He also is working on fiber formation in sickle cell hemoglobin, the mutant form of hemoglobin responsible for sickle cell anemia .
