= Inga (novel) =

2014 novel by Poile Sengupta

- Front cover
- Author: Poile Sengupta
- Language: English
- Genre: Novel
- Published: Westland Books
- Publication place: India
- Media type: print, e-book
- Pages: 315
- ISBN: 978-93-84030-64-3

Inga (2014) is an Indian English novel written by Poile Sengupta. The story of the novel revolves around the life and struggles of Rapa, a Tamil Brahmin woman.

Sengupta is mainly known as a playwright and a theatre personality. "Inga" was her debut novel. The book was officially released on 30 October 2014 at Bangalore India.

== Plot ==
Rapa was born and brought up in Delhi. In her education life, she gets introduced to foreign (English) literature, that she finds "fascinating".

== Release ==
This book was officially released on 30 October 2014 at Bangalore, India. In this event Indian writer Shashi Deshpande released the book and Chiranjiv Singh, a former Ambassador to UNESCO received the first copy.
