= Manavi (organization) =

- Founded: 1985
- Origins: New Brunswick, New Jersey
- Region served: New Jersey, United States
- Website: www.manavi.org

Manavi is a nonprofit organization based in the United States. The group was formed by six South Asian women: Shamita Das Dasgupta, Radha Sarma Hegde, Shashi Jain, Rashmi Jaipal, Vibha Jha, and Kavery Dutta, as a consciousness raising group interested in addressing concerns faced by South Asian women in the U.S. The organization also provides services to women facing violence and abuse.

== Overview ==
Founded in 1985, Manavi (meaning "primal woman" in Sanskrit) was the first organization in the U.S. to specifically address the needs of South Asian women who are victims of violence. Although started as a consciousness-raising group, Manavi's founders soon realized that South Asian women facing abuse were unable to seek help from local authorities and mainstream organizations for variety of reasons. These reasons could be attributed to cultural, lingual, and immigration barriers, among others.

Since Manavi came to existence, many other South Asian organizations for women have been formed in the U.S. along the lines of Manavi.

While providing direct service to South Asian women in need, Manavi is also a social change agent within the South Asian community. In addition, it is a cultural competency educator and diversity trainer in the mainstream movement to end violence against women in the U.S.
