= Duttagupta =

- Pronunciation: [Dottoɡupto]
- Language: Bengali

Origin
- Region of origin: Bengal region of India and Bangladesh

Other names
- Variant forms: Sengupta Gupta, Dasgupta, Kargupta, Debgupta

Duttagupta , also spelled as Dattagupta (Bengali: দত্তগুপ্ত) is a native Bengali surname, commonly found among the Bengalis of West Bengal, Assam, Tripura and Bangladesh. They belong to the Baidya caste of Bengal. The surname is a compound of Dutta and Gupta.

== Notable people ==
- Akhil Datta-Gupta (born January 21, 1960), a Regents Professor and holder of L. F. Peterson ‘36 Endowed Chair in Petroleum Engineering at Texas A&M University.
- Amlan Kusum Dattagupta (17 June 1924 – 18 February 2010), an Indian economist and educationist.
- Aparna Dutta Gupta (11 May 1953 - 29 June 2020), an Indian zoologist and academic.
- Anwesha Mita Dattagupta (born Anwesha Mita Dattagupta, 15 December 1993) is an Indian singer.
- Biren Dutta Gupta (20 June 1889 — 21 February 1910), an Indian nationalist.
- Kalpana Dattagupta (1913 - 1995), an Indian freedom fighter.
- Mira Datta Gupta (5 October 1907 – 18 January 1983), an Indian freedom fighter, social worker, educationist, politician.
