= Jishu Dasgupta =

- Born: 3 September 1956; Jessore, Khulna, East Pakistan
- Died: 21 December 2012 (aged 56); Kolkata, West Bengal, India
- Occupations: Director, cinematographer, producer & actor

Jishu Dasgupta (3 September 1956 – 21 December 2012) was an Indian Bengali television director and actor. After suffering from cancer for nine months, he died on 21 December 2012 in a hospital in Kolkata.

== Works ==
=== Television ===
Director

- Bhorer Khub kache
- Balika Badhu
- Utsaber Ratri
- Ekon Shakal
- Chuni-Panna
- De Re
- Kuasha Jakhon
- Manush
- Naachbe Radha
- Nana Ranger Din
- Tithir Atithi
- Sishirer Shabdo

Actor

- Abhinoy Noy (1983)
- Adalat O Ekti Meye (1982)
