= State Library of Louisiana =

Louisiana's state library agency

Coordinates: 30.4539°N 91.1880°W

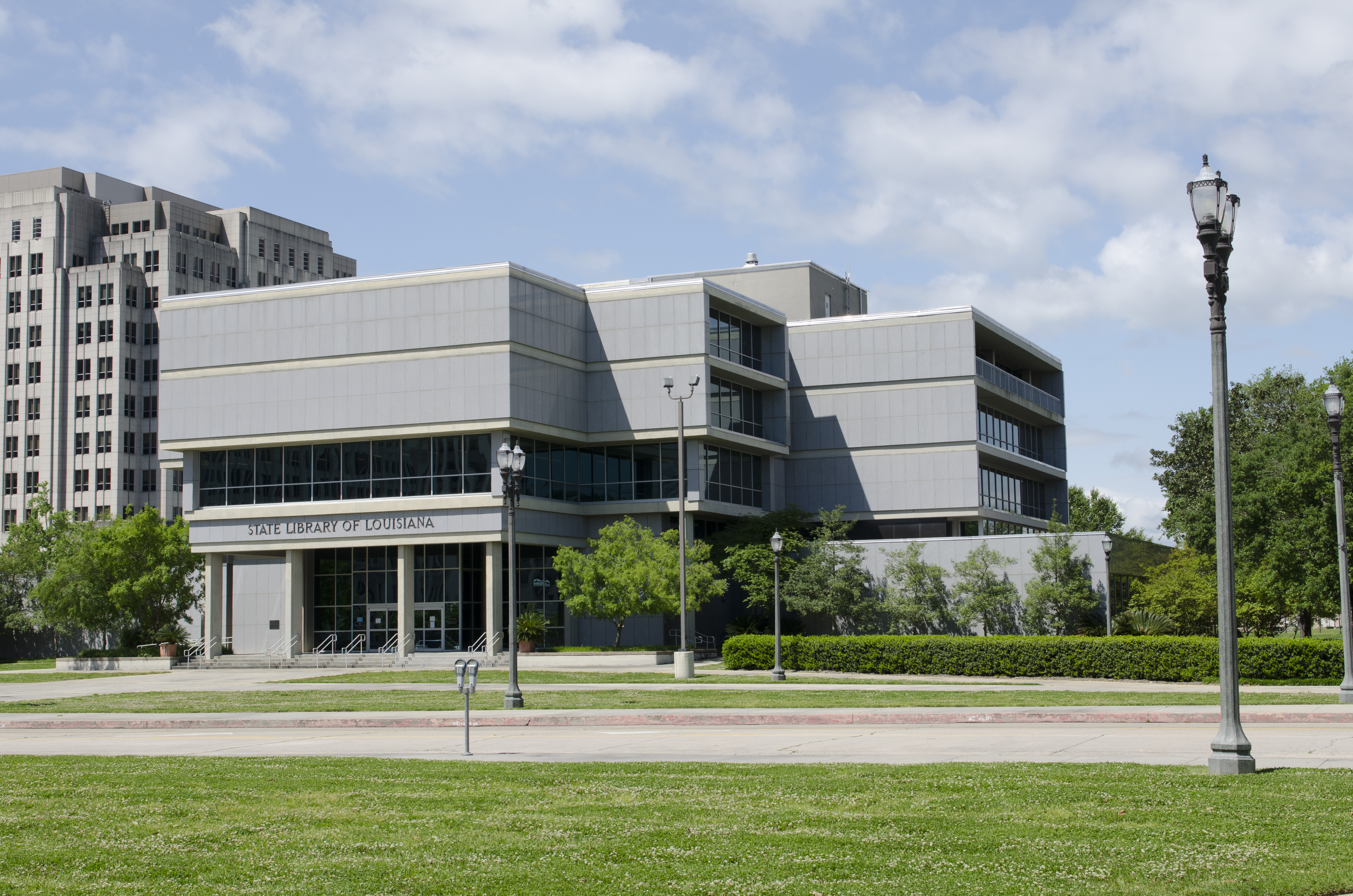
The State Library building in Baton Rouge

The State Library of Louisiana is Louisiana's state library agency, located in Baton Rouge.

== History ==
=== The first state library ===
The current state library was not the first. The Louisiana State Library was created in 1838. It was originally located in New Orleans, which was the state capital at the time. In 1849 the capital was moved to Baton Rouge, and the library also moved. During the Civil War the library was moved back to New Orleans to protect the collection. Only part of the collection was taken, and many of the materials that remained behind were lost or destroyed.

The library was negatively affected by the Civil War due to decreased funds. The lack of funding lasted long after the war had ended and greatly impaired development of the collection. The library remained in New Orleans until 1904. After years of neglect, the library was closed in 1911. The Law Library Society, which later became the Louisiana Law Library, added what remained of the collection to its own.

=== The current state library ===
In 1920, the Louisiana Legislature created the Louisiana Library Commission, a forerunner of the State Library of Louisiana. In 1925, the Commission joined with the philanthropic Carnegie Corporation to create a network of libraries across the state under the direction of Essae Martha Culver.

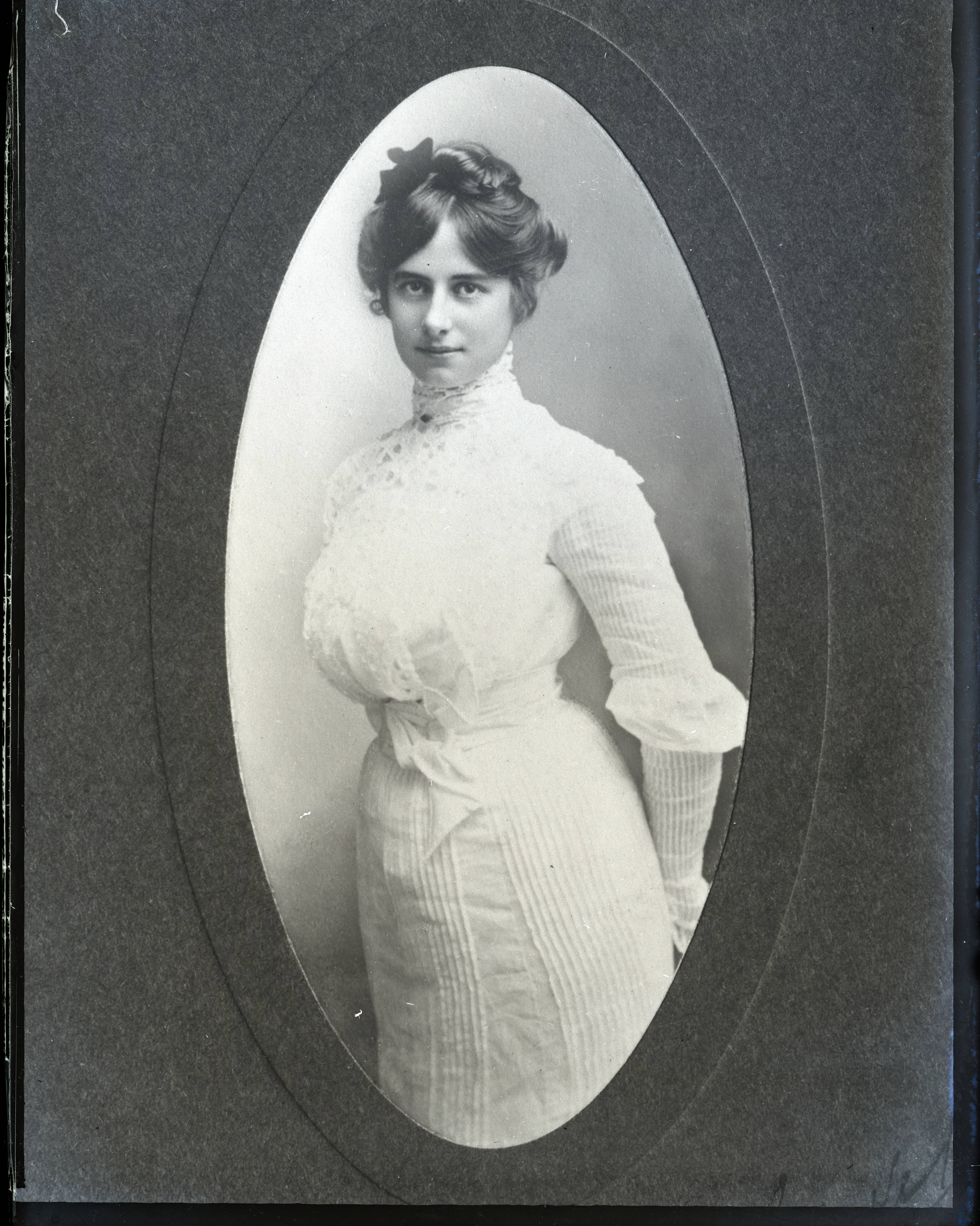
Portrait of Essae Martha Culver

The State Library of Louisiana opened on November 1, 1925, in Baton Rouge. The League of Library Commissions was searching for a rural state in need of a book service but without any funds to begin operation on their own. The league chose Louisiana to receive $50,000 from the Carnegie Corporation which was made available for a three-year demonstration period. In the beginning the state did not provide any additional financial assistance for the library. However, after the first year Louisiana appropriated $2,500 in aid. Yearly library appropriations by the state legislature have increased steadily over time.

The first service available in 1925 was book lending by mail. In the first year three hundred requests were received for the service.

From 1925 until 1932, the library was located in the Old State Capitol, in what was then called the old Adjutant General's Office. With other governmental departments, the library moved to the new capitol in 1932, to offices on the 18th floor. In 1940, the library was moved to North 3rd Street in the building which had been vacated by the Hill Memorial Library after Louisiana State University removed to a new campus south of town in 1926.

In 1925 there were only five free public libraries in the state which served 600,000 people. By 1950 there were 35 public libraries which served 2,225,000 people.

In June 1954 the state legislature passed a bond issue which included $2 million for a new state library building. The old Hill Memorial Library lacked the space needed for collections and demonstrations. After months of debate about where the site for the new library should be, it was decided to demolish the old building and construct a new library at the same location. The new building officially opened in November, 1958.

The Department for the Blind and Physically Handicapped, which had been run by the New Orleans Public Library since 1932, was taken over by the State Library in 1958 as the new building had a specially designed location for it.

==== State librarians ====
1. Henri Droz Sr. (1838 - after 1850)
2. Essae Martha Culver (1925-1968)
3. Sallie Farrell (1968-1981)
4. Thomas Jaques (1981-2005)
5. Rebecca Hamilton (2005-2022)
6. Meg Placke (2023-)

== See also ==
- List of libraries in the United States
