= Chandan Dasgupta =

Indian theoretical physicist

- Born: 1951 (age 74–75); Kolkata, West Bengal, India
- Education: University of Calcutta (B.Sc.); Delhi University (M.Sc.); University of Pennsylvania (Ph.D.)
- Known for: Contributions to Theoretical Condensed Matter Physics and Statistical Mechanics
- Awards: Warner Teutsch Memorial Prize(1974); Fellowship of the Alfred P Sloan Foundation (1984-87); DAE-Raja Ramanna Prize (1999); Fellow of the Academy of Sciences for the Developing World (TWAS) (2007); JC Bose National Fellowship (2006-10), The Satyendranath Bose Medal (2018).
- Scientific career
- Fields: Theoretical Condensed Matter Physics, Statistical Mechanics
- Workplaces: Indian Institute of Science, International Centre for Theoretical Sciences
- Doctoral advisor: A. Brooks Harris
- Other academic advisors: Shang-keng Ma, University of California, San Diego; Bertrand Halperin, Harvard University
- Notable students: Amit Chakrabarti; Abhishek Dhar

Chandan Dasgupta (Bengali: চন্দন দাশগুপ্ত), (born 1951) is an Indian theoretical physicist known for his contributions in condensed matter physics and statistical physics. He is at present a professor at Indian Institute of Science, Bangalore. He was the former dean of Undergraduate Program at Indian Institute of Science.

== Biography ==
Chandan Dasgupta earned his BSc degree in 1971 from Presidency College, University of Calcutta and MSc degree from Delhi University in 1973. He did his doctoral research at the University of Pennsylvania, USA under the supervision of Professor AB Harris and obtained PhD degree in Physics in 1978. Subsequently, he did post-doctoral research at the University of California, San Diego with Shang-keng Ma and at Harvard University with Bertrand Halperin, and worked as a faculty member in the School of Physics and Astronomy of the University of Minnesota for a few years. He joined the Indian Institute of Science in 1987, where, at present, he is a Professor.

Professor Dasgupta played a major role in the establishment of the Centre for Condensed Matter Theory at the Indian Institute of Science in 1998 and acted as the Convenor of the Centre (1998-2005). He is an Honorary Professor at the Jawaharlal Nehru Centre for Advanced Scientific Research and holds a Visiting Professorship at the University of Minnesota, USA.

== Research ==
Prof Chandan Dasgupta's area of specialization is theoretical condensed matter physics with emphasis on statistical mechanics.

- Supercooled liquids and the glass transition
- Superconductivity and superfluidity
- Dynamics of nonequilibrium systems
- Physics at the nanoscale

== Awards and honours ==
Chandan Dasgupta was awarded Sir C.V. Raman Award for Research in Physical Sciences in 2006 by the University Grants Commission. In 2007, he was elected as a fellow of The World Academy of Sciences . He was awarded with "The Satyendranath Bose Medal" by Indian National Science Academy in 2018.
