= Shamita Das DasGupta =

American activist

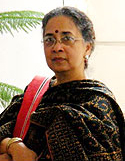
- Born: Shamita Das; February 1949 (age 77); India
- Education: Sakhawat Memorial High School; BS, MS, PhD Ohio State University
- Occupations: Teaching, social activism
- Notable work: cofounder of Manavi
- Spouse: Sujan DasGupta
- Children: Sayantani DasGupta

Shamita Das DasGupta (née Das; Bengali: শমীতা দাশ দাশগুপ্ত; born February 1949) is an Indian-born American scholar and activist. A social activist since early 1970s, she co-founded Manavi in 1985. It is the first organization of its kind that focuses on violence against South Asian women in the United States. A part-time teacher and full-time community worker, she has written extensively in the areas of ethnicity, gender, immigration, and violence against women. Her books include: A Patchwork Shawl: Chronicles of South Asian Women in America, Body Evidence: Intimate Violence Against South Asian Women in America, Globalization and Transnational Surrogacy in India: Outsourcing Life and Mothers for Sale: Women in Kolkata’s Sex Trade.

== Background ==
Married at an early age, she moved to the USA at the age of 19. She did her undergraduate and graduate studies at Ohio State University and received her PhD in developmental psychology. She moved to New Jersey and taught at Rutgers University for several years.

From her association with various women's organizations, she realized that South Asian women were generally ignored by the mainstream domestic violence organizations, so she decided to establish an organization that would focus on their unique issues. She co-founded Manavi, an organization for South Asian women, in New Jersey with five other women.

== Activism and academia ==
She describes herself as a community worker. She has established herself as an academic through research and teaching. She has written numerous articles on south Asian women’s issues and collaborated with her physician daughter, Sayantani DasGupta, on mother-daughter experiences. Currently she is an adjunct faculty member at the New York University School of Law. She serves on the editorial board of the "Violence against Women" journal. The recipient of many awards, including the Bannerman Fellowship, she is on the boards of several national organizations.

== Bibliography ==
- The demon slayers and other stories: Bengali folk tales. Interlink Books. 1995. ISBN 978-1-56656-156-3.
- A Patchwork Shawl: Chronicles of South Asian Women in America. Rutgers University Press. 1998. ISBN 978-0-81352-518-1.
- Body Evidence: Intimate Violence against South Asian Women in America. Rutgers University Press. 2007. ISBN 978-0-81353-982-9.
- Mothers for Sale: Women in Kolkata's Sex Trade. Dasgupta-Alliance. 2009. ISBN 978-8-18211-051-9.
- Globalization and Transnational Surrogacy in India: Outsourcing Life. Rowman & Littlefield. 2014. ISBN 978-0-73918-742-5.
