= Hem Chandra Dasgupta =

Indian geologist

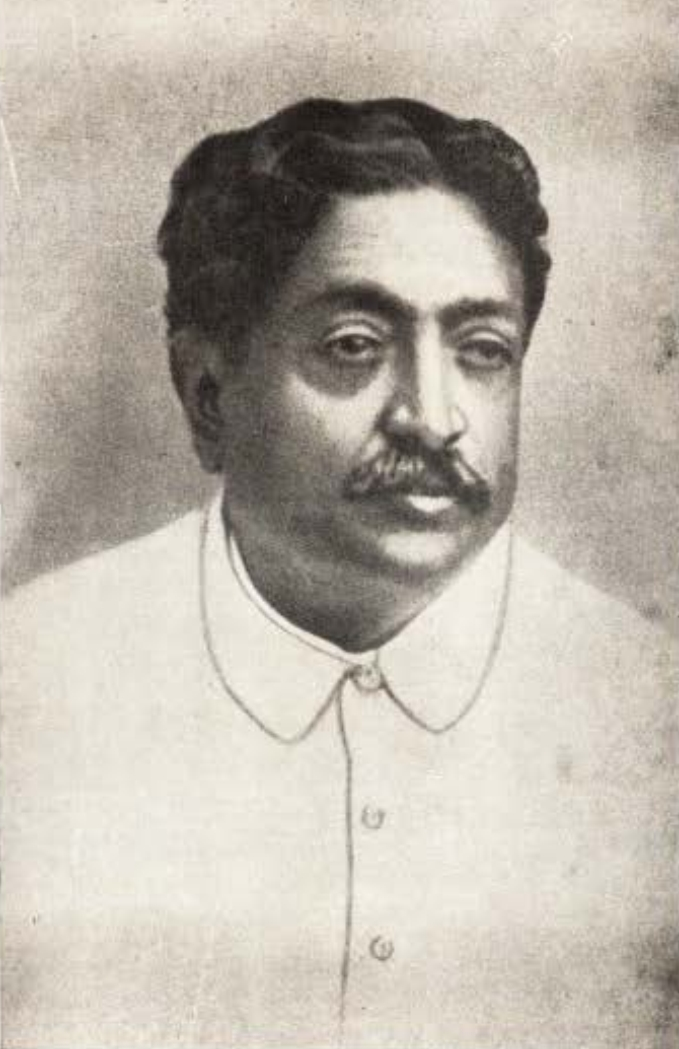

Hem Chandra Dasgupta (1878 – 1933) was an Indian geologist and a professor of geology at Presidency College and Calcutta University.

== Life ==
Dasgupta graduated and post-graduated in 1900 from Presidency College, Calcutta. He was a faculty member of the Presidency College geology department from 1903 to 1933. Dasgupta was the first Indian full-time teacher.

Dasgupta was later appointed the head of the geology departments at both Presidency College and Calcutta University.

Dasgupta initiated and actively encouraged many geology research projects in India. He contributed to the furtherance of paleontology and the stratigraphy of different parts of India.

Dasgupta was a Foundation Fellow and the first Honorary Joint Secretary of the Geological Mining and Metallurgical Society of India (GMMSI).
