= Anasuya Sengupta (poet) =

Indian-American poet, rights activist, entrepreneur (born 1974)

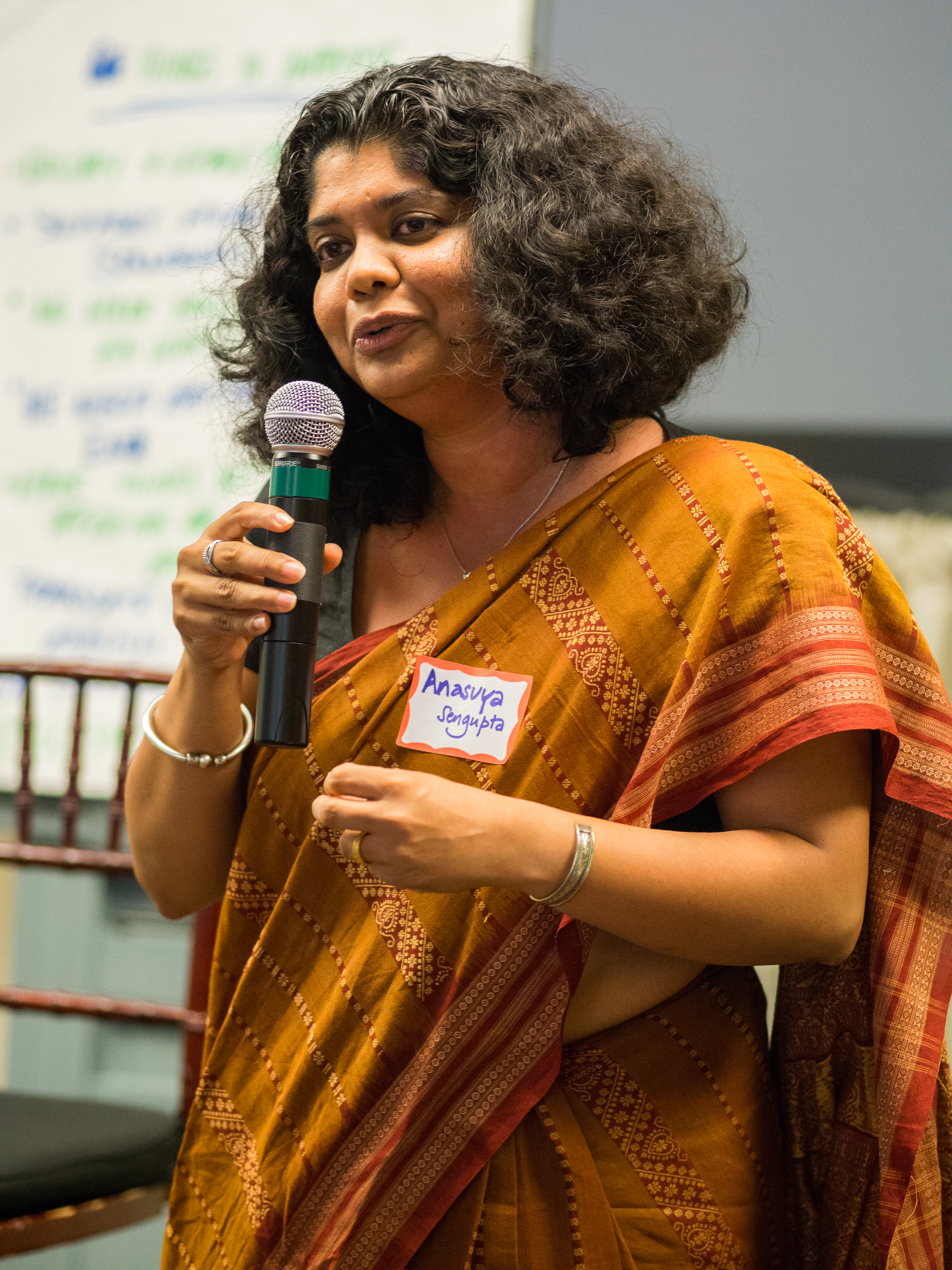
- Sengupta in 2013
- Born: 1974 (age 51–52); Bangalore
- Citizenship: Indian
- Known for: Founder of Whose Knowledge
- Mother: Poile Sengupta

Anasuya Sengupta is an Indian poet, author, activist, and a cited expert in representation for marginalized voices on the Internet.

== Early life ==
Sengupta was born in 1974 to her father, Abhijit Sengupta, a senior Indian administrative officer, and her mother, Poile Sengupta (née Ambica Gopalakrishnan), an actress, author of children's literature, and playwright. She spent the majority of her childhood in North Karnataka, a region of southern India.

On her upbringing, Sengupta remarked, "I have grown up in a family that is committed to social justice." She speaks English, Hindi, Kannada, Bengali, Tamil and Malayalam.

== Education ==
She finished her 12th grade from National Public School, Indira Nagar in 1992. Sengupta received her B.A. in economics from Lady Shri Ram College for Women, a constituent college of Delhi University in New Delhi, India, where she graduated in 1995 with honours. She is noted as a prominent alumni of Lady Shri Ram College for Women Sengupta was invited to recite part of her poem "Silence" at the 2014 Genderknowledge Academic Congress, which was held at her undergraduate alma mater.

In 1998, she received a master of philosophy degree in development studies from Queen Elizabeth House, Oxford University studying as a Rhodes Scholar. She later did her doctoral work in politics at Oxford studying formal and informal structures and practices within the police in Karnataka. According to Paul Amar's book New Racial Missions of Policing: International Perspectives on Evolving Law, the title of her thesis at Oxford was "Embedded or Stuck: the Study of the Indian State, its Embeddedness in Social Institutions and State Capacity." Sengupta contributed a chapter to this book, entitled, "Concept, Category, and Claim: Insights on Caste and Ethnicity from the Police in India." Additionally, Sengupta was a visiting scholar at the University of California, Berkeley from 2007 to 2009.

== Work and activism ==
Former United States Secretary of State Hillary Clinton became aware of one of Sengupta's poems in March 1995, when Clinton was the First Lady and visiting India. Later, Clinton used it in her speeches in Delhi and at a United Nations women's conference in Beijing, China.

(excerpt from "Silence"):

Too many women
in too many countries
speak the same language
of silence

The poem also inspired Clinton to write a chapter in her autobiography, Living History entitled "Silence Is Not Spoken Here".

Sengupta co-edited Defending Our Dreams: Global Feminist Voices for a New Generation (2005) which was reviewed favorably by Sister Namibia. The Women's Review of Books praised her essay in Defending Our Dreams, calling it a "visionary" work about feminism and the eradication of poverty. In Development in Practice, a reviewer comments that the "connection between dreaming and planning is the most arresting element the book offers to its readers. The dreams of its young contributors, are demonstrating new visions, new skills, and new approaches to development and feminism, which present a potential breakthrough in strategies for promoting social justice and women's rights." Feminist Studies praised the book and wrote, "This volume does provide a surprisingly cohesive account, for a collection, of the thinking of key feminists about international trends."- See the publications section below for more information.

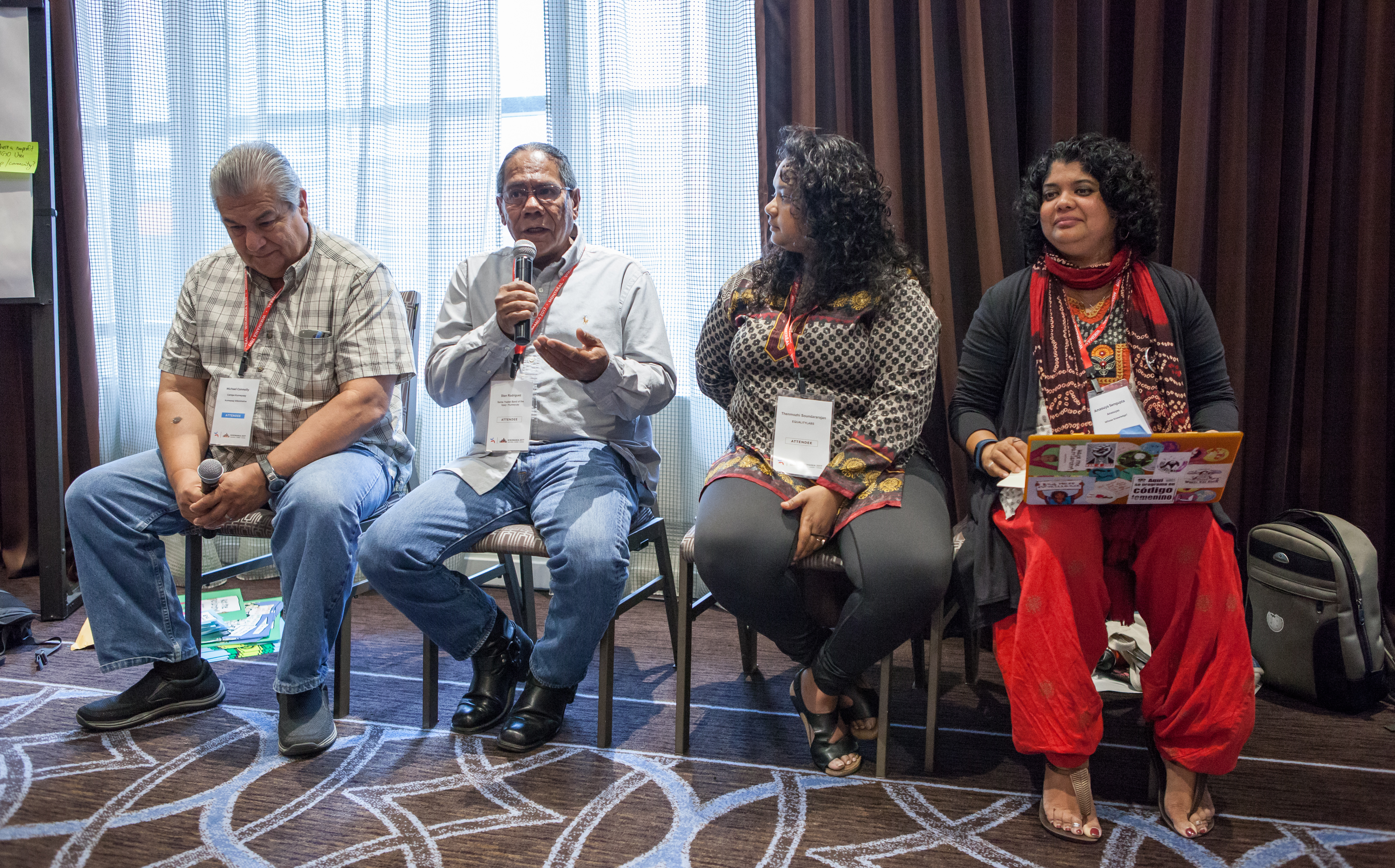
Sengupta (far right) in a panel discussion at Wikimania 2017 in Montreal

Sengupta was the Chief Grantmaking Officer at the Wikimedia Foundation in San Francisco, California.

=== Whose Knowledge? Campaign ===
Along with Siko Bouterse and Adele Vrana, she co-founded Whose Knowledge, a global feminist campaign to center the knowledge of marginalized communities (the majority of the world) on the internet, including Asia, Africa and Latin America. She works as the co-director of the organization. The group has been described as "a global, multilingual campaign to reimagine the internet to be for and from all."

In October 2018, Sengupta's work to decolonise the internet was supported by a fellowship from the Shuttleworth Foundation.

In a keynote speech she gave at the Digital Library Federation's 2018 Forum, Sengupta spoke on her work to decolonise the internet. She said, "decolonising [the internet is] at the heart of true empowerment. In many ways, the crisis of violence and injustice that we face today feel like they are rooted in a hidden crisis of unknowing." Sengupta went on to discuss the importance of libraries and the need for a greater representation of the world's languages on the internet.

Sengupta has used her platform to advocate for the decolonisation of knowledge in the Media. On 11 July 2016, she co-authored an article with Thenmozhi Soundararajan, Harjit Kaur, and Umar Malick on the need for revisions for social-science textbooks in California for the Indian Express. In this article, the authors argue that the Hindutva lobby has marginalised the identities of other communities (such as the Dalit people, whom Whose Knowledge works with) in their effort to revise California's textbooks. They also advocate for the removal of historical inaccuracies in textbooks to dismantle false narratives about certain religious or ethnic groups, specifically Muslims.

Furthermore, Sengupta has been featured in other major media outlets for her work to decolonise the internet, including BBC News, The Guardian, Mail & Guardian, and The Atlantic, among others.

On 11 December 2018, Sengupta and Claudia Pozo released a resource series, "Our Stories, Our Knowledges" through Whose Knowledge. It is divided split into four parts: "Part 1: Decolonising Our Stories and Knowledges", "Part 2: Transformative Practices for Building Community Knowledges", "Part 3: Adding Our Knowledge to Wikipedia", and "Part 4: How to Ally and Be a Good Guest". The series focuses on the structures of power which silence marginalized voices, practices for those communities to overcome epistemic barriers placed upon them by white colonialist structures, the work of Whose Knowledge in these efforts, and advice for allies who want to get involved in decolonising the internet.

In September 2018, The Oxford Internet Institute awarded Sengupta the Internet and Society Awards for her work on Whose Knowledge; Nani Jensen Reventlow was also presented with this honor for her work on the Digital Freedom Fund, an organization which works towards the advancement of digital rights in Europe through litigation.

== Publications and Scholarship ==
=== Defending Our Dreams: Global Feminist Voices for a New Generation. ===
This book features writing from eighteen diverse feminists from Australia, Barbados, Canada, India, Nepal, South Africa, Tanzania, UK, Uruguay, USA and Venezuela. These feminists discuss pressing socio-political themes including women's rights, the economy, sexual identity, technologies and innovation, and the development of gender-based political movements. It was conceptualized and edited by Wilson, Sengupta, and Evans in an attempt to bring together the narratives of feminists from varying socio-economic, geopolitical, and racial backgrounds.

== See also ==
- Gender bias on Wikipedia
- Whose Knowledge
- Women in Red
