= Piyush Dasgupta =

Indian academician, political activist and Marxist theoretician

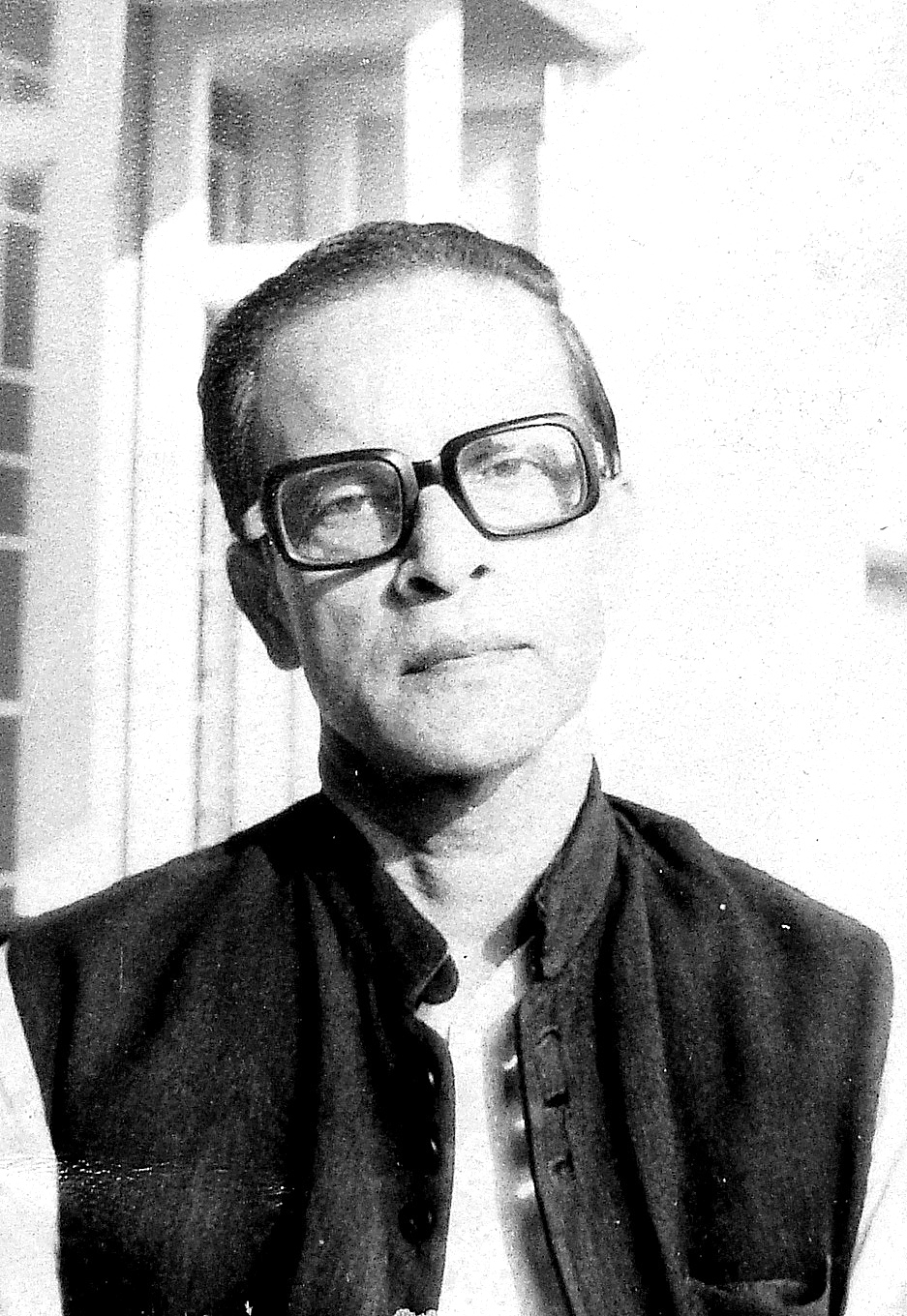

Personal details
- Born: 30 October 1922 Faridpur, Bengal Presidency, British India
- Spouse: Swasti Dasgupta
- Children: 2
- Education: Scottish Church College, University of Calcutta
- Profession: Academician

Piyush Dasgupta (Bengali: পীযূষ দাশগুপ্ত, 30 October 1922 – 12 August 2002) was an Indian academic, author, a political activist, Marxist theoretician and a life-long communist.

He was a member of the Communist Party of India and was considered integral to the leftist movement in Bengal for four decades. In 1949, Dasgupta led a fifty-six day hunger strike for the rights of political prisoners whilst imprisoned in Presidency Jail, Kolkata. In the early 1960s, Dasgupta was part of the underground leadership of the Communist Party of India (Marxist) during the time it was banned.. As a professor of economics and political science, Dasgupta is considered instrumental in furthering Marxist discourse in Bengal, including completing the translation of Das Kapital at the request of Muzaffar Ahmad, co-founder of the Communist Party of India. The translation was possibly a first in any Indian language. Dasgupta was part of the editorial team of People's Democracy (newspaper), Deshhitaishee, the head of the National Book Agency.

== Early life and education ==
Piyush Dasgupta was born on 30 October 1922 in Kotalipara, Madaripur sub-division of the Faridpur district of (what was at the time) British India. He was the eldest son of Gangacharan Dasgupta and Suhasini Devi. He studied at the Madaripur School, Intermediate of Arts (IA) and Rajendra College of Faridpur before moving to Kolkata. Dasgupta obtained his bachelor's degree from Scottish Church College, followed by a master’s degree in Economics from University of Calcutta in 1944.

Madaripur was considered an epicentre of the freedom struggle movement, and Dasgupta first got involved at a young age. He was associated with left revolutionaries including Anukul Chatterjee of Jugantar and became a member of ‘Sanskritik Sabhayan’ ('সাংস্কৃতিক সভায়ন'), a revolutionary organisation. In 1931 Dasgupta was assaulted by the colonial police after he unfurled the tricolour flag on top of the Congress Bhavan in Madaripur in defiance of the district magistrate's order.

On 7 August 1941, Dasgupta, Annadashankar Bhattacharya, and another comrade laid a wreath on the mortal remains of Rabindranath Tagore in front of the Senate Hall of Calcutta University, on behalf of the Communist Party of India. As the political party was banned by the British government, this was considered a significant act of defiance.

== Work and legacy ==
Aged 22, Dasgupta became professor at the newly established Nabadwip Vidyasagar College. However, conservative elements within the town opposed the introduction of modern education and studies. In the following years, Dasgupta taught at City College, Kolkata; Scottish Church College and Maharaja Manindra Chandra College. He gained some acclaim as an orator and a teacher, and emerged as a young Marxist theoretician in Bengal.

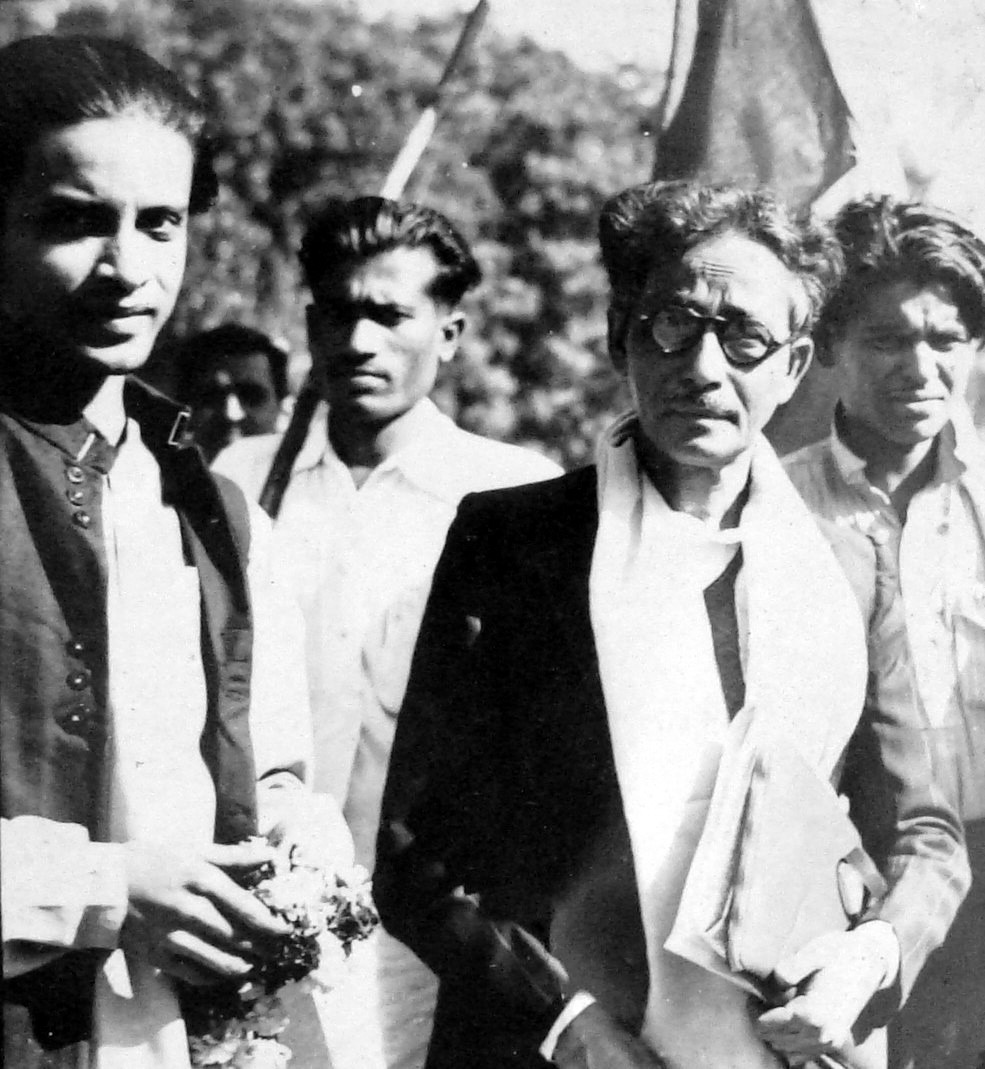
Piyush Dasgupta (extreme left) with Muzaffar Ahmad (2nd from right) while campaigning for the first general election in 1952 in Nabadwip.

Dasgupta was arrested in 1949 after the West Bengal Government banned the Communist Party of India. He was imprisoned in Presidency Jail, Kolkata, where he led a fifty-six day hunger strike for the rights of political prisoners.

In 1959, Manindrachandra College terminated Dasgupta’s employment as a consequence of his political beliefs and influence. As a result, a number of students and faculty, and students from across West Bengal, joined a month-long hunger strike. Nirmal Kumar Sidhanta, the vice-chancellor of Calcutta University gave verbal assurances that Dasgupta would be reinstated and the strike was terminated. However, Sidhanta’s assurance was never honoured.

Piyush Dasgupta was a polymath. In addition to his understanding of economics and political science, he had a deep knowledge of history, philosophy and literature. In 1960, he assumed responsibility for the National Book Agency (NBA) – a significant publishing house of the time in Kolkata..

In 1964, the Communist Party of India split into two, and Dasgupta joined the Communist Party of India (Marxist) (CPIM). Immediately after the split, the majority of the top leaders of CPIM were imprisoned. The CPIM established an underground wing of the party with Samar Mukherjee as the secretary. Dasgupta supported the party administration across West Bengal and came out of hiding in 1966.

Shortly afterwards, CPIM faced another split with the emergence of the Naxalbari movement, one of the most fractious periods in post-independence Bengal.

Piyush Dasgupta was also on the editorial committee of Deshhitaishi and People's Democracy (newspaper). Throughout 1950s to the 1990s, his articles on economics, politics and literature appeared in publications like Mukhapatra, Nandan, Bangladesh, The Telegraph (India) and Bartaman.

During the 1960s, Dasgupta was involved in the West Bengal College and University Teachers Association. In 1969, he became the principal of the newly established Netaji Nagar College, Kolkata. Under his stewardship, the college quickly grew in stature and recognition.

== Select publications ==
- Bharater Krishak Bidroha, National Book Agency, 1953.
- Tolstoy Prasange Lenin, National Book Agency, 1957.
- Life of Muzaffar Ahmad on the occasion of his 74th birthday celebrations, Calcutta, National Book Agency, 1963.
- Das Capital, Bani Prakash, 1974.
- Stalin Rachanabali, Nabajatak Prakashan, 1975.
- Anyachoke Rabindranath O Bibidha Prasanga, Bani Prakash, 1988.
- Shilpa O Sahitya Prasange: Marx theke Mao, Bani Prakash, 1990.

== Citations ==
- Gangopadhyay, Sunil (2010). প্রথম আলো (Pratham Alo) (in Bengali). Kolkata: Ananda Publishers. p. 1132. ISBN 978-8177568295.
- Bannerjee, D. L. (1963). Index translationum indicarum. A cumulation of entries for India in 'Index Translationum', Unesco, Paris, vols. 2-11. Kolkata: National Library, Calcutta. p. 60.
- "Das Kapital", Wikipedia, 22 August 2022
- Bandyopadhyay, Manik (1990). Bardhan, Kalpana (ed.). "A Tale of These Days". Of Women, Outcastes, Peasants, and Rebels: A Selection of Bengali Short Stories. Berkeley: University of California Press. p. 135. doi:10.1525/9780520909458-011. S2CID 226776121.
- Bannerjee, Milinda. "Political Theology and Democracy: Perspectives from South Asia, West Asia, and North Africa". ResearchGate.
