= Nilanjana Dasgupta =

Social Psychologist

Nilanjana 'Buju' Dasgupta
- Education: Smith College; Yale University
- Awards: Application of Personality and Social Psychology Award from the Society for Personality and Social Psychology; Chancellor's medal from the University of Massachusetts, Amherst
- Scientific career
- Fields: social psychology
- Thesis: Pigments of the imagination : the role of perceived skin color in stereotype maintenance and exacerbation (1998)
- Website: Research website

Nilanjana Dasgupta is a social psychologist whose work focuses on the effects of social contexts on implicit stereotypes - particularly on factors that insulate women in STEM fields from harmful stereotypes which suggest that females perform poorly in such areas. Dasgupta is a professor of Psychology and is the Director of the Institute of Diversity Sciences and the University of Massachusetts, Amherst.

== Education and career ==
Prior to joining the Psychology faculty at the University of Massachusetts in 2003, Dasgupta (b. 1969) received an A.B. from Smith College in 1992 in Psychology with a minor in Neuroscience. In 1998, she received a PhD in Psychology from Yale University. Dasgupta then became a postdoctoral fellow at the University of Washington, Seattle and, afterward, an assistant professor at the New School for Social Research from 1999 to 2002.

At the University of Massachusetts Amherst, Dasgupta has served in several leadership roles and earned awards for her service to the university. In 2005-2006 Dasgupta was A Lilly Teaching fellow and 2006-7 she was a Family Research Scholar at UMass Amherst. From 2014 to 2020 she served as the Director of Faculty Equity and Inclusion in the College of Natural Sciences at the University of Massachusetts, Amherst. Dasgupta is co-PI of an NSF Advance program that seeks to transforms the campus by cultivating faculty equity, inclusion and success at the University of Massachusetts Amherst. In 2019 Dasgupta was recognized by the College of Natural Sciences at UMass Amherst for Excellence in Diversity & Inclusion.

Dasgupta has held several leadership positions in national and international professional societies. She is serving on the National Science Foundation's Advisory Committee for Social, Behavioral, and Economic Sciences (2015–17). She is an elected member of the executive committee of the Society of Experimental Social Psychology, and was elected to be President of the society in 2017. Dr. Dasgupta serves on the Training Committee of the Society for Personality and Social Psychology, and on the steering committee of the International Social Cognition Network. Dasgupta was an elected member of the council of the Society for the Psychological Study of Social Issues (2012–14).

== Research ==
Dasgupta proposed the Stereotype Inoculation Model which explains how, for women in STEM fields, experts and peers from one's own group in a working or learning environment can help individuals become more successful despite the pervasiveness of stereotypes casting doubt upon their ability.

Dasgupta has also conducted research on situational influences on unconscious stereotyping and prejudice. One project, a collaboration with David Desteno, indicates that anger, but not sadness tends to increase bias against people in different social groups than their own and that feeling a specific emotion can make people more biased against groups whose stereotypes are associated with that emotion. Dasgupta and her colleagues have also found that being exposed to counterstereotypic or well-liked members of groups like African-Americans or women can reduce unconscious bias against those groups on the Implicit Association Task. She theorized that four things influence stereotypes and prejudice, and should be taken into account when trying to change implicit biases: 1) self- and social-motives, 2) specific strategies, 3) the perceiver's focus of attention, and 4) configuration of stimulus cues.

== Awards and honors ==
In 2009 Dasgupta was elected to the fellowships of both the Association for Psychological Science. and the Society of Experimental Social Psychology. In 2011, Dasgupta and her collaborators received a Smashing Bias Research Prize awarded by the Mitchell Kapor Foundation and Level Playing Field Institute She also received the Morton Deutsch Award from the International Society for Justice Research. In 2016 Dasgupta received the Application of Personality and Social Psychology Award from the Society for Personality and Social Psychology. In 2017 Dasgupta received Chancellor's Award for Outstanding Accomplishments in Research & Creative Activity; this is the highest recognition bestowed to faculty by the University of Massachusetts Amherst. As part of that award she delivered a Distinguished Faculty Lecture on “STEMing the Tide: How Female Professors and Peers Can Encourage Young Women in Science, Technology, Engineering and Mathematics".
