= Purnendu Dasgupta =

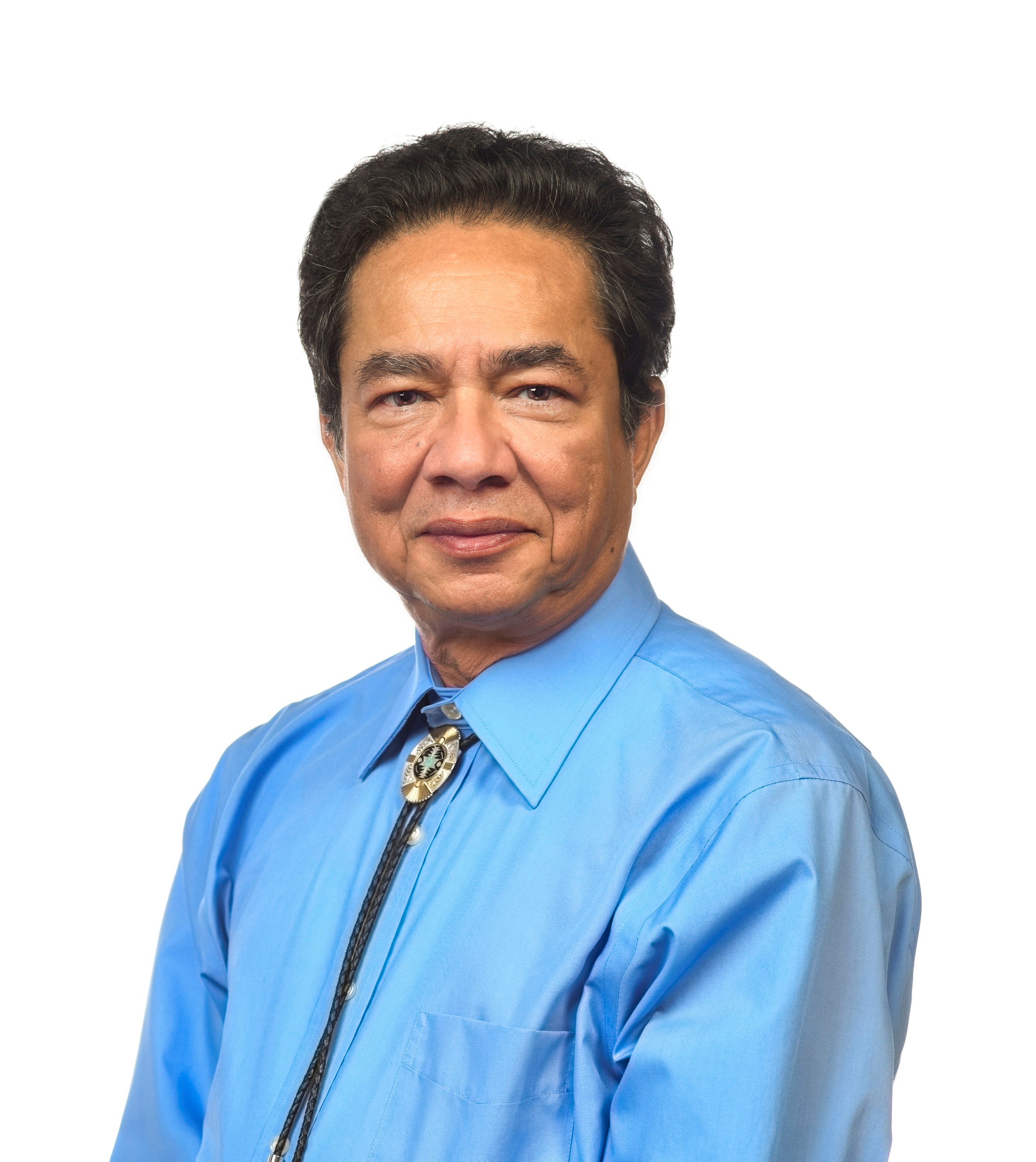

Purnendu K. Dasgupta is a professor of chemistry and biochemistry at the University of Texas at Arlington.

== Education and work ==
Dasgupta was born in India. Dasgupta's father and grandfather were also university teachers. He got his Bachelor's degree in chemistry from a college run by Irish missionaries. He was selected as scholar in the National Talent Search Examination. He completed his master's in the University of Burdwan and served as research scholar in the Department of Physical Chemistry at the Indian Association for the Cultivation of Science.

In 1973, he went to United States and attended Louisiana State University at Baton Rouge as a graduate student in electrochemistry. In 1977, he received his PhD in analytical chemistry with a minor in electrical engineering under Philip W. West. In 1981, he joined Texas Tech as a professor. In 1992 he became a Paul Whitfield Horn Professor, the highest distinction at Texas Tech, named after the first President of the University. In 2007, he joined the University of Texas at Arlington as Jenkins Garrett Professor and Chair. He has since been elected an adjunct faculty member both in Departments of Physics and Electrical Engineering. Since 2015, he has occupied the Hamish Small Chair in Ion Analysis, endowed by Thermo Fisher Scientific.

== Awards ==
- 1981 Frank R. Blood Award for best publication, Society of Toxicology and Pharmacology
- 1987 Institute Medal, Institute of Industrial Sciences, University of Tokyo
- 1989 P. A. Traylor Creativity Award, Analytical Sciences, Dow Chemical, Midland, MI
- 1989 Outstanding Achievement Award, International Ion Chromatography Symposium
- 1991 Barney E. Rushing, Jr. 1990 Faculty Distinguished Research Award, Texas Tech University Dads and Moms Association
- 1998 A. A. Benedetti-Pichler Memorial Award, American Microchemical Society
- 2001 Inducted Honorary Member, Korean Society for Environmental Analysis
- 2003 Elected IEEE Senior Member
- 2004-2005 ARCS Foundation, Lubbock Chapter. Scientist of the Year
- 2005 Outstanding Achievement Award, International Ion Chromatography Symposium
- 2006 Best Science Paper of 2005, Environmental Science and Technology, Editor’s Award
- 2011 American Chemical Society Award in Chromatography
- 2012 Dal Nogare Award in Chromatography
- 2012 The Senate of the State of Texas. Honor Proclamation
- 2012 Doherty Award, DFW Section of the American Chemical Society
- 2015 J. Calvin Giddings Award of the American Chemical Society Division of Analytical Chemistry
- 2015 Elected Fellow, The Institute of Electrical and Electronics Engineers (IEEE)
- 2015 Elected honorary member, Japan Society for Analytical Chemistry
- 2015 Biennial Power List Analytical Scientist Magazine
- 2016 DFW Metroplex Technology Business Council. Tech Titans Technology Inventor Award
- 2016 Fields Award in Analytical Chemistry, Eastern Analytical Symposium
- 2017 Biennial Power List Analytical Scientist Magazine
- 2017 Top ten “Landmark Literature” papers in analytical sciences, Analytical Scientist Magazine
- 2017 Talanta Gold Medal Award in Analytical Chemistry
- 2018 Texas Academy of Science, Texas Distinguished Scientist of the Year
- 2018 American Chemical Society Award in Chemical Instrumentation
- 2019 University of Texas at Dallas. Chemistry and Biochemistry Student Association Distinguished Lecturer
- 2023 The Analytical Scientist. Decadal Top 100 Analytical Scientist List
- 2025 American Chemical Society Award in Analytical Chemistry
