= Poile Sengupta =

Indian writer

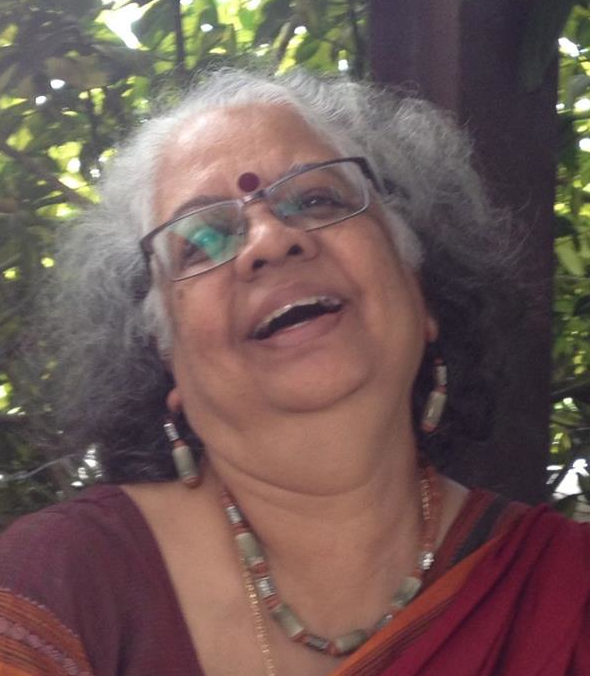
Poile Sengupta in 2014

Poile Sengupta (née Ambika Gopalakrishnan; born 1948) is an Indian English-language writer. She is especially well-known as a playwright and writer for children. Her formal first name is Ambika but she writes, and is known, as Poile. Sengupta has been a college lecturer, a senior school teacher, an educational consultant, a communication and language skills consultant, a consultant editor for a market research firm, and a teacher for Montessori school children.

== Career ==
=== Writing ===
A number of Sengupta's books for children have been published, including The Exquisite Balance (1985), The Way to My Friend's House (1988), The Story of the Road (1993), How the Path Grew (1997)- (all Children's Book Trust, New Delhi), The Clever Carpenter and Other Stories, The Naughty Dog and Other Stories, and The Black Snake and Other Stories (all Frank Brothers, New Delhi, 1993), Waterflowers (Scholastic, 2000), Vikram and Vetal (2006) and Vikramaditya's Throne(2007)(Puffin). Role Call has been translated into Bhasa Indonesia and Vikram and Vetal into French. She has also written The Lights Changed. This short has been written in the NCERT book of civics for class 6.

Her stories for children have been included in a number of anthologies like The Puffin Treasury of Modern Indian Stories, The Puffin Book of Funny Stories, Favourite Stories for Boys, Favourite Stories for Girls, A Clear Blue Sky and Bad Moon Rising, all from Puffin, India, More Mystery Stories (1989), 24 Short Stories (1991), both from Children's Book Trust, New Delhi, Sorry, Best Friend (1996) and One World, both from Tulika, Chennai, the Target Annuals (1989,1990)and The Best of Target.

She has written a number of columns for children, the longest running of which, 'A Letter to You', a humour column about a 10-year-old boy Perky and his friend Raghu, ran intermittently in the weekly, later monthly, magazine Children's World for over thirty years. Another column of hers, 'Role Call', about school life, appeared weekly in the Deccan Herald; and a selection was published in two volumes Role Call (2003) and Role Call Again (Rupa, 2003). A third, short lived, column for children was 'Write Hear' in Midday, Mumbai.

As a playwright, her first full-length play, Mangalam, won the award for the most socially-relevant theme in The Hindu-Madras Players Playscripts Competition in 1993. Since then, she wrote a series of plays for both adults and children including Inner Laws (1994), A Pretty Business (1995), Keats Was A Tuber (1996), Collages(1998), Alipha (2001) and Thus Spake Shoorpanakha, So Said Shakuni (2001) and Yavamajakka (a musical for children) (2000). In 2008, Samara's Song was shortlisted for the Hindu Metro Plus Playwright award. Six of her plays have been published as Women Centre Stage: The Dramatist and the Play, Routledge, Delhi and London, 2010. She received, in 1999-2001, a senior fellowship of the Government of India to write plays for children in English. A collection of these plays for children, Good Heavens! has been published by Puffin, India (2006.

In 1991, a collection of her poetry, A Woman Speaks, was published by Writers Workshop, Calcutta. Poile Sengupta also occasionally writes short fiction. Her short story 'Ammulu' was shortlisted for the 2012 Commonwealth Short Story Prize.

In October 2014, her novel Inga was published.

=== Acting ===
Poile has been an actor on stage and in film (The Outhouse directed by Leslie Carvalho and Shaitaan directed by Bejoy Nambiar). She is the founder of Theatre Club, a Bangalore-based amateur theatre group. She has been a Member of the Governing Council of National School of Drama, New Delhi. She has also thrice been on the jury of Trinity College, London, international competition of plays for young people.
