= Sayantani DasGupta =

American novelist (born 1970)

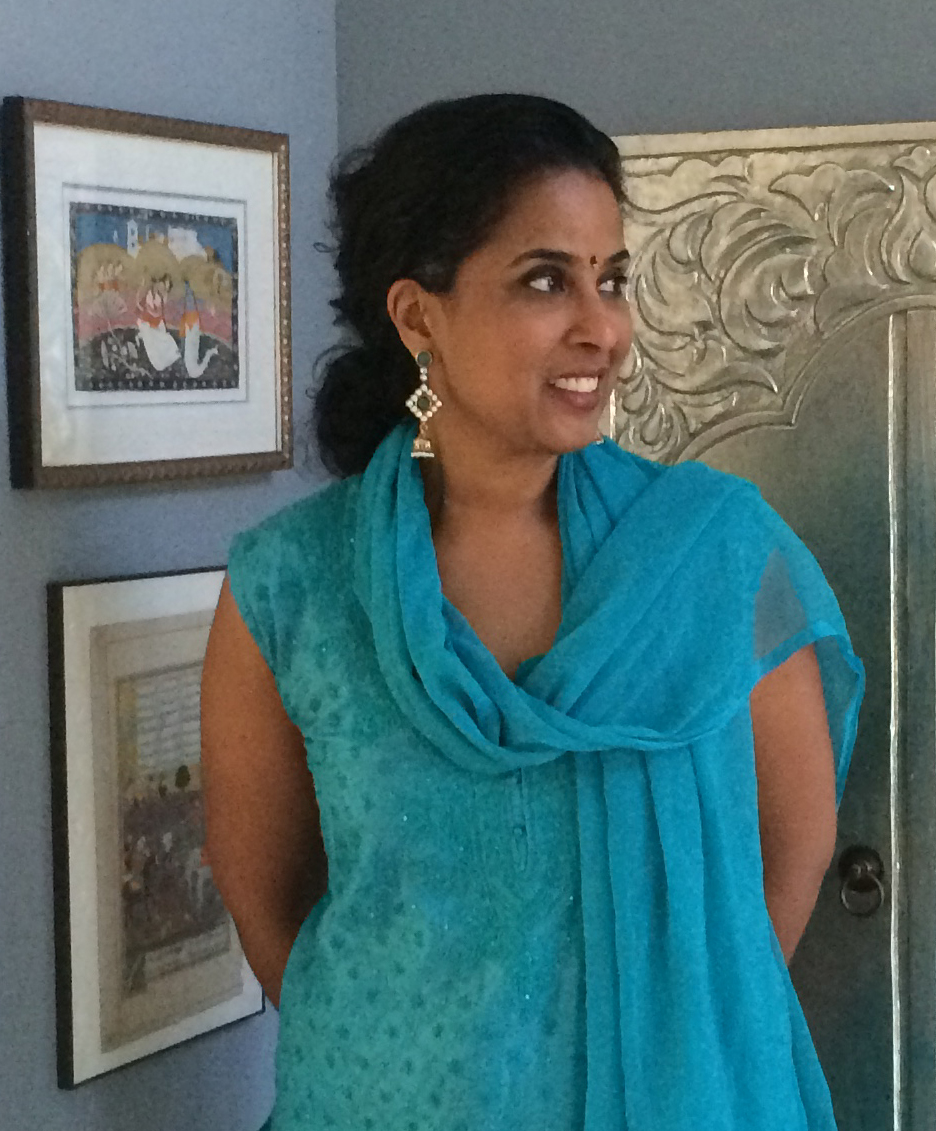
- Born: 1970 (age 55–56); Columbus, Ohio, U.S.
- Education: Brown University; Johns Hopkins School of Medicine
- Parents: Sujan Dasgupta (father); Shamita Das Dasgupta (mother)
- Scientific career
- Fields: Narrative medicine and Public health
- Workplaces: Sarah Lawrence College; Columbia University
- Website: Official website

Sayantani DasGupta (born 1970) is an American physician and author of Indian (Bengali) heritage.

== Early life and education ==
DasGupta grew up in Ohio and New Jersey and completed her undergraduate studies at Brown University. She obtained her M.D and MPH degrees from Johns Hopkins University.

== Academia ==
Originally trained in pediatrics and public health, Sayantani now teaches in the Master's Program in Narrative medicine at Columbia University and the Graduate Program in Health Advocacy at Sarah Lawrence College. She is a nationally recognized speaker on issues of gender, race, storytelling, and medical education, and has been featured on the cover of Ms., in O, The Oprah Magazine, in documentary films and other media outlets. She is an associate editor of the journal Literature and Medicine.

== Publications ==
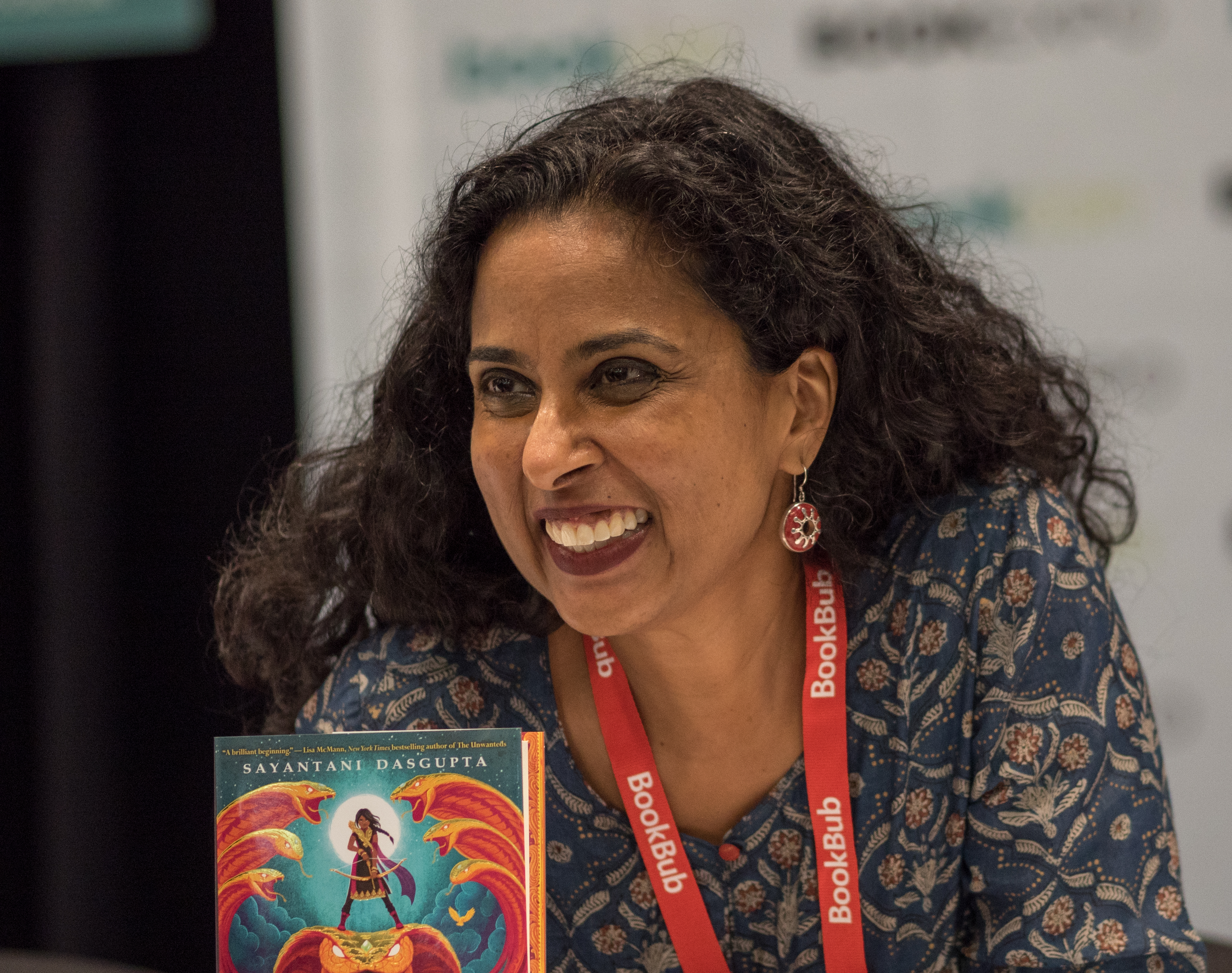
DasGupta at an autographing booth at BookExpo America in 2018, promoting The Serpent's Secret

DasGupta has been published widely in academic and literary outlets, and journals including JAMA, The Lancet, Ms., Literary Mama Magazine, and Hunger Mountain. She has written extensively with her activist mother, Shamita Das DasGupta, on mother-daughter experiences.

She is the co-author of a book on Bengali folktales, author of a memoir about her education at Johns Hopkins School of Medicine, and co-editor of an award winning collection of women's illness narratives. Her debut middle-grade novel, The Serpent's Secret (Kiranmala and the Kingdom Beyond #1), came out in February 2018. Her second book, Game of Stars (Kiranmala and the Kingdom Beyond #2), published in February, 2019, entered the New York Times Bestseller list in its debut week.

== Views ==
In July 2025, DasGupta took part to the controversy over American Eagle Outfitters's "Sydney Sweeney Has Great Jeans" ad campaign. She stated on TikTok that the campaign, which made a pun on "jeans" and "genes" and featured blonde, blue-haired actress Sydney Sweeney, was "imbued with eugenic messaging" which had seen the "forced sterilization and decrease of reproduction among undesirable communities" and that it was "contributing to and reinforcing this kind of anti-immigrant, anti-people of colour, pro-eugenic, political moment". DasGupta's post became viral and contributed to the social media backlash against the ad.

== Bibliography ==
=== Children's books ===
- She Persisted: Virginia Apgar (with Chelsea Clinton, illustrated by Alexandra Boiger and Gillian Flint) (2021)

=== Middle grade books ===
==== Kiranmala and the Kingdom Beyond ====
- The Serpent's Secret (2018)
- The Game of Stars (2019)
- The Chaos Curse (2020)

==== The Fire Queen ====
- Force of Fire (2021)
- Crown of Flames (2022)

==== Secrets of the Sky ====
- The Chaos Monster (2023)
- The Poison Waves (2023)

=== Young adult books ===
- Debating Darcy (2022)
- Rosewood: A Midsummer Meet Cute (2023)

==== As a contributor ====
- "Blue" in Two and Twenty Dark Tales: Dark Retellings of Mother Goose Rhymes (2012)
- "Daughter of the Sun" in Magic Has No Borders (2023)

=== Adult books ===
- The Demon Slayers And Other Stories: Bengali Folk Tales (with Shamita Das Dasgupta) (1994)
- Her Own Medicine: A Woman's Journey from Student to Doctor (1999)

==== As a contributor ====
- Speculative Fiction 2013: The Year's Best Online Reviews, Essays and Commentary (2014)
- Globalization and Transnational Surrogacy in India: Outsourcing Life (also editor) (2014)
- The Principles and Practice of Narrative Medicine (2016)
- Good Girls Marry Doctors: South Asian American Daughters on Obedience and Rebellion (2017)

==== As an editor ====
- Stories of Illness and Healing: Women Write Their Bodies (2007)
