= Process hazard analysis =

A process hazard analysis (PHA) (or process hazard evaluation) is an exercise for the identification of hazards of a process facility and the qualitative or semi-quantitative assessment of the associated risk. A PHA provides information intended to assist managers and employees in making decisions for improving safety and reducing the consequences of unwanted or unplanned releases of hazardous materials. A PHA is directed toward analyzing potential causes and consequences of fires, explosions, releases of toxic or flammable chemicals and major spills of hazardous chemicals, and it focuses on equipment, instrumentation, utilities, human actions, and external factors that might impact the process. It is one of the elements of OSHA's program for Process Safety Management.

There are several methodologies that can be used to conduct a PHA, including checklists, hazard identification (HAZID) reviews, what-if reviews and SWIFT, hazard and operability studies (HAZOP), failure mode and effect analysis (FMEA), etc. PHA methods are qualitative or, at best, semi-quantitative in nature. A simple element of risk quantification is often introduced in the form of a risk matrix, as in preliminary hazard analysis (PreHA). The selection of the methodology to be used depends on a number of factors, including the complexity of the process, the length of time a process has been in operation and if a PHA has been conducted on the process before, and if the process is unique, or industrially common. Quantitative methods for risk assessment, such as layer-of-protection analysis (LOPA) or fault tree analysis (FTA) may be used after a PHA, if the PHA team could not reach a risk decision for a given scenario.

In the United States, the use of PHAs is mandated as one of the elements of the Occupational Safety and Health Administration (OSHA)' process safety management regulation for the identification of risks involved in the design, operation, and modification of processes that handle highly hazardous chemicals.

== See also ==
- Cyber PHA
