= Process Safety Management (OSHA regulation) =

Industrial workplace safety management system

Process Safety Management of Highly Hazardous Chemicals is a regulation promulgated by the U.S. Occupational Safety and Health Administration (OSHA). It defines and regulates a process safety management (PSM) program for plants using, storing, manufacturing, handling or carrying out on-site movement of hazardous materials above defined amount thresholds. Companies affected by the regulation usually build a compliant process safety management system and integrate it in their safety management system. Non-U.S. companies frequently choose on a voluntary basis to use the OSHA scheme in their business.

The PSM regulation was the culmination of a push for more comprehensive regulation of facilities storing and/or processing hazardous materials, which began in the wake of the 1984 Bhopal disaster. The regulation was promulgated by OSHA in 1992 in fulfilment of requirements set in the 1990 amendments to the Clean Air Act. The EPA followed suit with a similar and complementary regulation in 1996.

== Compliance ==
Any U.S. facility that stores or uses a hazardous material above thresholds defined in section (a)(1) and Appendix A must comply with the PSM regulation. For individual chemical species listed in Appendix A, threshold quantities vary from as low as 100 lb (45 kg; e.g., methyl hydrazine, phosgene) to as much as 15,000 lb (6804 kg; e.g., ammonia solutions, methyl chloride). The threshold for flammable gases and liquids (the latter defined as having a flash point below 100 °F or 37.8 °C) is 10,000 lb (4536 kg).

Usually, these facilities are also subject to another, similar regulation issued by the Environmental Protection Agency (EPA), known as the Risk Management Program (RMP) rule (Title 40 CFR Part 68). The Center for Chemical Process Safety (CCPS) of the American Institute of Chemical Engineers (AIChE) publishes guidelines for building PSM systems that comply and exceed OSHA's expectations. These include for example guidelines on process safety documentation and implementing process safety management systems.

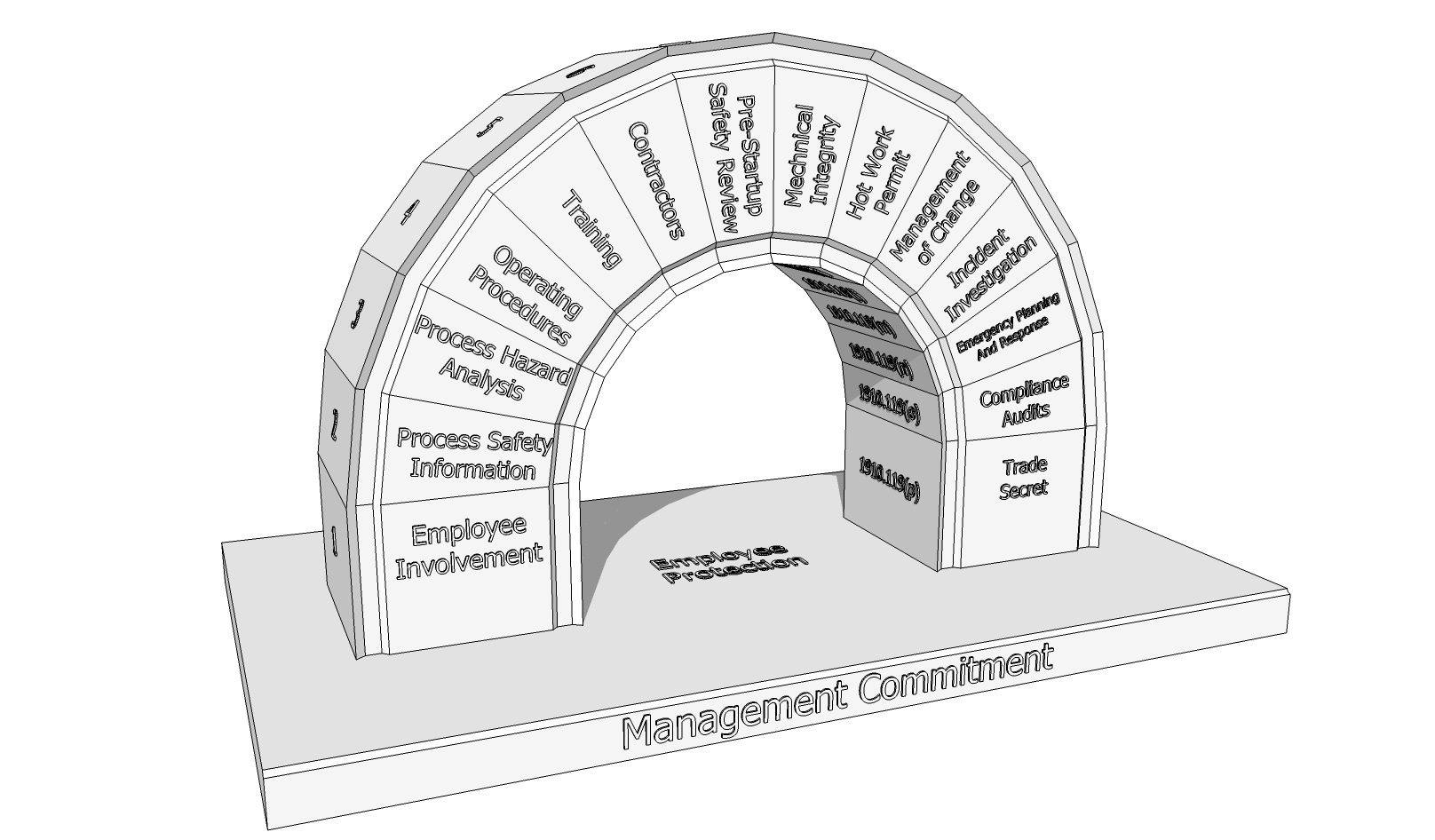
Fourteen elements of OSHA's process safety management program

== Process Safety Management elements ==
The Process Safety Management program is divided into 14 "elements":

- Employee participation
- Process safety information
- Process hazard analysis
- Operating procedures
- Training
- Contractors
- Pre-startup safety review
- Mechanical integrity
- Hot work permit
- Management of change
- Incident investigation
- Emergency planning and response
- Compliance audits
- Trade secrets

All the elements are interlinked and interdependent. Every element either contributes information to other elements for the completion or utilizes information from other elements in order to be completed.

=== Employee participation ===
Under PSM, employers must consult with employees and their representatives on the conduct and development of process hazard analyses and on the development of the other elements of process management, and they must provide to employees and their representatives access to process hazard analyses and to all other information required to be developed by the standard. Employee participation in process safety activities and processes helps the organization build a positive climate of collaboration across management and workers, which sustains in turn a strong process safety culture.

=== Process safety information ===
Process safety information (PSI) refers to key documentation for identifying and understanding the hazards posed by the plant activities involving highly hazardous chemicals. In order to be in compliance with the OSHA PSM regulation, process safety information should include information pertaining to three areas: hazardous chemicals used or produced, technology of the process, and equipment in the process.^{[5]}

Information pertaining to the material hazards (which is usually collected in dedicated Material Safety Data Sheets [MSDS]) shall consist of at least:

- Toxicity information
- Permissible exposure limits
- Physical data
- Reactivity data
- Corrosivity data
- Thermal and chemical stability data
- Hazardous effects of inadvertent mixing of different materials that could foreseeably occur

Information pertaining to the technology of the process shall include at least:

- A block flow diagram or simplified process flow diagram
- Process chemistry and its properties
- Maximum intended inventory
- Safety upper and lower limits for such items as temperatures, pressures, flows or compositions
- An evaluation of the consequences of deviations, including those affecting the safety and health of the employees

Information pertaining to the equipment in the process should include the following:

- Materials of construction
- Piping and instrumentation diagrams (P&IDs)
- Electrical classification
- Relief system design and design basis
- Ventilation system design
- Design codes and standards employed
- Material and energy balances
- Safety system (for example interlocks, detection and suppression systems)

The employer shall document that equipment complies with "recognized and generally accepted good engineering practices" (RAGAGEP).

=== Process hazard analysis ===
A process hazard analysis (PHA) (or process hazard evaluation) is an exercise for the identification of hazards of a process facility and the qualitative or semi-quantitative assessment of the associated risk. A PHA provides information intended to assist managers and employees in making decisions for improving safety and reducing the consequences of unwanted or unplanned releases of hazardous materials. A PHA is directed toward analyzing potential causes and consequences of fires, explosions, releases of toxic or flammable chemicals and major spills of hazardous chemicals, and it focuses on equipment, instrumentation, utilities, human actions, and external factors that might impact the process.

This element has been called "the heart of the program", as it "impacts or interfaces with all of the other elements". PHA relies on availability and completeness of process safety information; it requires employee participation in order to be effective; it may impact operating procedure through its findings and recommendations; it must be embedded in any management-of-change process and any pre-start-up safety review.

There are varieties of methodologies that can be used to conduct a PHA, including checklists, Preliminary Hazard Analysis (PreHA), Hazard Identification (HAZID) reviews, What-If reviews and SWIFT, Hazard and Operability (HAZOP) studies, Failure Mode and Effect Analysis (FMEA), etc.

=== Operating procedures ===
Operating procedures must be consistent with the process safety information and provide clear instructions for safely conducting activities involving hazardous materials. To ensure that a ready and up-to-date reference is available, and to form a foundation for needed employee training, operating procedures must be readily accessible to employees who work in or maintain a process. They must address at least the following elements:

- Steps for each operating phase: initial startup, normal operations, temporary operations, emergency shutdown, emergency operations, normal shutdown, and startup following a planned or emergency shutdown.
- Operating limits: consequences of deviation, and steps required to correct or avoid deviation.
- Safety and health considerations: properties and hazards of the chemicals used in the process, precautions (including engineering controls, administrative controls, and personal protective equipment), control measures to be taken if physical contact or airborne exposure occurs, quality control for raw materials and control of hazardous chemical inventory levels, any special or unique hazards, and safety systems (e.g., interlocks, detection or suppression).

The operating procedures must be reviewed as often as necessary to ensure that they reflect current operating practices, including changes in process chemicals, technology, equipment, and facilities. To guard against outdated or inaccurate operating procedures, the employer must certify annually that these operating procedures are current and accurate.

It is mandatory that the following activities be covered in dedicated operating procedures: lockout/tagout, confined space entry, opening process equipment or piping, and control over entrance into a facility by maintenance, contractor, laboratory, or other support personnel. These safe work practices must apply both to employees and to contractor employees.

=== Training ===
Training relevant to PSM must include emphasis on the specific safety and health hazards of the process, emergency operations including shutdown, and other safe work practices that apply to the employee’s job tasks. The regulation distinguishes between two types of training relevant to PSM, i.e. initial training and refresher training. Training records must be kept and maintained.

=== Contractors ===
Contractor management is important in any safety management system, including process safety management programs. A contracting company has to be mindful that outsourced personnel are not necessarily aware of the work site hazards and/or the way the contracting company manages those hazards. Contractors may also introduce new hazards to the plant.

OSHA's PSM includes special provisions for contractors and their employees to emphasize the importance of everyone taking care that they do nothing to endanger those working nearby who may work for another employer. The contracting party must obtain and evaluate the contractor's safety performance and programs, inform the contracted personnel of the relevant fire, explosion, or toxic release hazards, explain to them the applicable provisions of the emergency action plan, evaluate periodically their performance in fulfilling their obligations, and maintain a contract employee injury and illness log. The contracted company must ensure that its employees have sufficient relevant training for the contracted job, ensure that its employees are instructed in the relevant site process hazards and the applicable provisions of the emergency action plan, document that they have received and understood required training, keep a record of key information about the contracted employees on the job and the activities carried out, and ensure that each contracted employee follows the safety rules of the facility.

=== Pre-startup safety review ===
A pre-startup safety review (PSSR) shall take place before any highly hazardous material is introduced into a process, i.e. before the plant start-up. The requirement applies to new facilities and modified ones, when the modification causes changes in the process safety information. The review must confirm that:

- Construction and equipment are in accordance with design specifications.
- Safety, operating, maintenance, and emergency procedures are in place and are adequate.
- A process hazard analysis has been performed for new facilities and recommendations have been resolved or implemented.
- Modified facilities meet the management of change requirements.
- Training of each employee involved in operating a process has been completed.

=== Mechanical integrity ===
In the context of OSHA's PSM, mechanical integrity requirements apply to the following equipment:

- Pressure vessels and storage tanks.
- Piping systems (including piping components such as valves).
- Relief and vent systems and devices.
- Emergency shutdown systems.
- Controls (including monitoring devices and sensors, alarms, and interlocks).
- Pumps.

In order to minimize the risk of unwanted releases of hazardous materials, companies must establish and implement adequate maintenance strategies.

PSM schemes other than OSHA's usually extend this element to cover the integrity assurance of safety-critical systems in general, not just those directly responsible for fluid containment, according to a wider asset integrity management strategy that includes systems such as active and passive fire protection, fire and gas detection, sources of emergency power, etc.

=== Hot work permit ===
Among several safety systems of work relevant to hazardous process plants, OSHA's PSM singles out the permit-to-work for hot work as arguably the most critical for the prevention of major process safety accidents. Hot work provides ignition sources to potential flammable vapors, which can cause fires and/or explosions. The permit must document that the fire prevention and protection requirements in OSHA regulations have been implemented prior to beginning the hot work operations. It must indicate the date(s) authorized for hot work and identify the object on which hot work is to be performed. The permit must be kept on file until completion of the hot work.

=== Management of change ===
Undocumented, not properly risk assessed changes to a plant handling hazardous materials are a recipe for disaster. An eminent example of this is the Flixborough disaster, where improvised changes involving the bypassing of a stage in a reactor train was at the origin of the accident. The change had not been properly thought out, documented and risk-assessed, so that the event of breach of containment had not been identified. Changes to a process must be thoroughly evaluated to fully assess their impact on employee safety and health and to determine needed changes to operating procedures. Written procedures to manage changes (except for “replacements in kind”) to process chemicals, technology, equipment, and procedures must be established and implemented. Minimum content of the documentation is:

- The technical basis for the change.
- Impact of the change on safety and health.
- Modifications to operating procedures.
- Necessary time period for the change.
- Authorization requirements.

Employees who operate a process and maintenance and contract employees whose job tasks will be affected by a change in the process must be informed of, and trained in, the change.

=== Incident investigation ===
Incident investigation provides a fundamental opportunity to learn from past mistakes and disseminate the new knowledge gathered throughout the organization and, if possible, to external stakeholders. Accordingly, thorough internal investigation of incidents to identify the chain of events and causes is crucial to OSHA's PSM. Investigation must be initiated as promptly as possible, not later than 48 hours following the incident. OSHA establishes requirements for the investigation team selection and the content of the investigation report, which has to conclude with a series of relevant lessons learnt in the form of recommendations. These shall be tracked and closed out accordingly.

=== Emergency planning and response ===
The consequences of an accident can be significantly reduced with effective emergency planning and response. By way of example, the response to the Tacoa disaster was largely unorganized and uninformed about the nature of the fire that was burning inside a fuel oil tank. As a result, the responders, as well as scores of bystanders and media workers, stayed well within the area impacted by the violent boilover that took place, which resulted in the death of more than 150 people. Additionally, robust emergency management helps an organization safeguard its public image in case of accidents. Accordingly, the PSM regulation mandates that emergency preparedness arrangements be put in place, including emergency pre-planning and training to make employees aware of, and able to execute, proper actions. The plan must comply with the provisions of other OSHA rules (29 CFR 1910.38).

=== Compliance audits ===
Similar to incident investigation, audits are an important tool an organization can use to assess whether its process safety management system is in place and it is effectively applied throughout its ranks. To be certain process safety management is effective, employers subject to the PSM regulation must certify by way of audits that they have evaluated compliance with the provisions of PSM at least every three years. The compliance audit must be conducted by at least one person knowledgeable in the process and a report of the findings of the audit must be developed and documented noting deficiencies that have been corrected.

=== Trade secrets ===
OSHA's PSM is the only major process safety management code to include trade secrets among its elements. Emphasis is given in the regulation to the fact that trade secrets may in principle restrict circulation of key information in several ambits of process safety management, such as process safety information, compliance audits, operating procedures, process hazard analysis, incident investigation, etc. The regulation makes it compulsory for organizations to release the information to the respective parties, irrespective of whether it is protected by trade secrecy. Nothing in PSM, however, precludes the employer from requiring those persons to enter into confidentiality agreements not to disclose the information.

== See also ==
- Process safety
- Safety management systems
