= Chemical accident =

Unintentional release of hazardous chemicals

A chemical accident, also commonly known as a chemical leak is the unintentional release of one or more hazardous chemicals, which could harm human health and the environment. Such events include fires, explosions, and release of toxic materials that may cause people illness, injury, or disability. Chemical accidents can be caused for example by natural disasters, human error, or deliberate acts for personal gain. Chemical accidents are generally understood to be industrial-scale ones, often with important offsite consequences. Unintended exposure to chemicals that occur at smaller work sites, as well as in private premises during everyday activities are usually not referred to as chemical accidents.

Process safety is the engineering discipline dealing with chemical accident hazards understanding and management. Process safety's scope extends however to fires and explosions from hazardous materials generally not referred to as 'chemicals', such as refined and unrefined hydrocarbon mixtures.

== Frequency ==
=== United States ===
Chemical accidents are relatively common in the United States, with a significant accident occurring on average multiple times per week. Most chemical accidents never make national headline news. American chemical industry public relations professionals claim that such accidents are becoming less frequent but the U.S. Environmental Protection Agency states that they are increasing in frequency, with higher average annual rates of population evacuations and of people needing medical treatment resulting from chemical accidents. Texas is the leading U.S. state in chemical accidents. According to a November 2023 study by Coming Clean and the Environmental Justice Health Alliance for Chemical Policy Reform, more than 40 died between 2021 and 2023 s a result of hazardous chemical incidents in the U.S.

The United Kingdom responds to around 1,000 chemical incidents per year, the majority of these were relatively short-lived fires. Majority of the large-scale incidents occurred at industrial, commercial, and agricultural sites. These large-scale fires do cause significant amounts of damage however the after math can be worse by releasing toxic smoke, asbestos, and other potential hazards chemicals. Many of the UK's chemical hazard analysis and statistics are funded by the HPRUs or the health protection research units.

=== China ===
Since 2015 to 2021 China has experienced 295 chemical accidents which had led to the deaths of 1325 people. The areas most affected in China are those with low GDP such as Shandong, Tianjin, Jiangsu, and Hebei Provinces. Out of the providences precisely mentioned from 2016 to 2021 chemical accident and casualties have been an upward trend.

== Examples ==
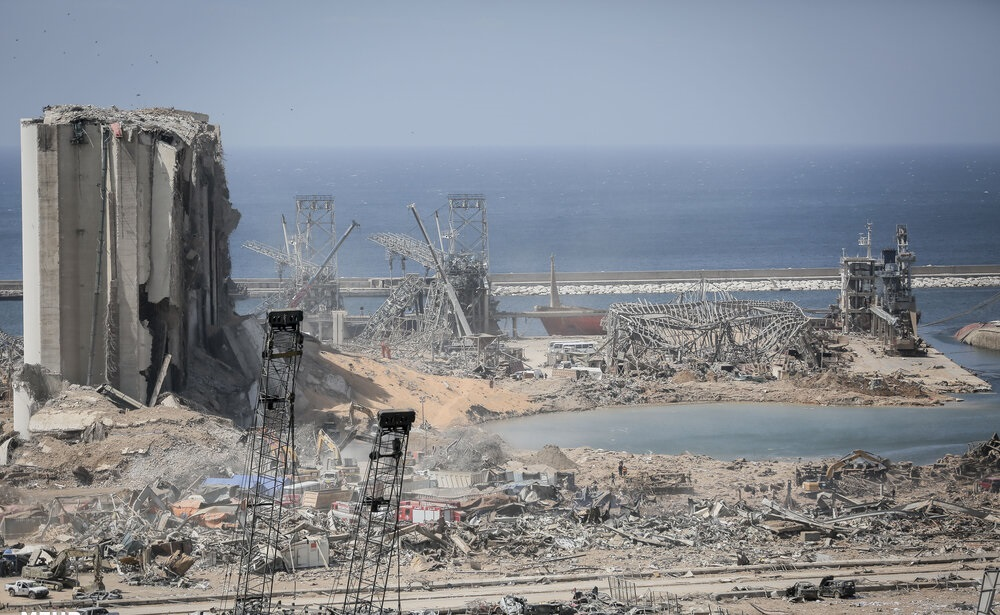
Aftermath of the 2020 Beirut explosion.

=== Bhopal Accident ===
The most dangerous chemical accident recorded in history was the 1984 Bhopal gas tragedy in India, in which more than 3,000 people died after highly toxic methyl isocyanate was released at a Union Carbide pesticides factory. The release happened after the storage tank safety valve had failed to contain the excess pressure created by the exothermic reaction between water and methyl isocyanate. The accident was caused by a faulty valve that let the water into the tank. The safety refrigeration unit for the tank also was not functional since it did not have any coolant.

=== Beirut Accident ===
The 2020 Beirut explosion was one of the biggest non-nuclear explosions in history. It happened when approximately 2,750 tons of ammonium nitrate inside a warehouse at the port exploded. The improper storage alongside a fire breaking out near the warehouse caused the explosion. The explosion killed 218 people, injured 7,000, and displaced 300,000 people.

=== Tianjin Explosions ===
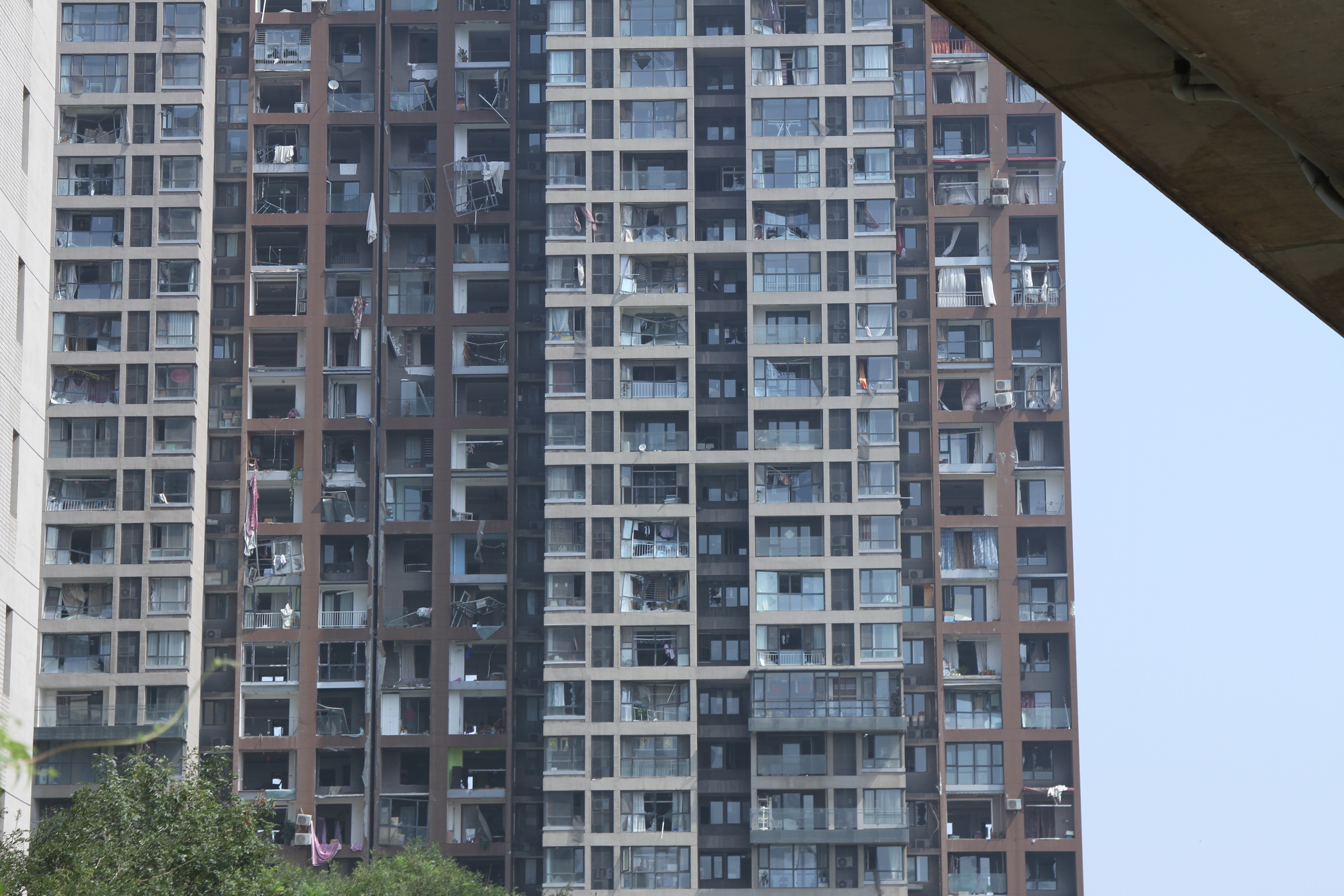
Buildings damaged in the aftermath of the Tianjin explosions

Two chemical explosions occurred in a warehouse at a port in Tianjin, China which contained flammable chemicals such as calcium carbide. Chinese officials have still yet to identify the direct cause of the explosion however officials have stated the likely cause is that the calcium carbide mixed with water and an explosion occurred. The explosion was the equivalent to three tons of TNT where the second explosion had the power of 21 tons of TNT. The explosion destroyed a significant portion of the surrounding port, tossing shipping containers. 720 people were taken to the hospital and out of the 720, 60 were critically injured. The people living in the surrounding area had to evacuate their homes and were moved to local schools.

== Regulation and government agencies ==
=== European Union ===
In the European Union, incidents such as the Flixborough disaster and the Seveso disaster led to legislation such as the Seveso Directive, which mandates safety reports to be prepared by process and storage plants and issued to local and regional authorities.

=== United States ===
In the United States, concern about chemical accidents after the Bhopal disaster led to the passage of the 1986 Emergency Planning and Community Right-to-Know Act. The EPCRA requires local emergency planning efforts throughout the country, including emergency notifications. The law also requires companies to make publicly available information about their storage of toxic chemicals. Based on such information, citizens can identify the vulnerable zones in which severe toxic releases could cause harm or even in some cases death.

Alongside the EPCRA two other government regulations were formed the Process Safety Management and the Risk Management Plans. These agencies help with the control and management of chemical accidents however the differ slightly from each other. PSM focuses on protecting workers and employees that can potentially be exposed and is run by OSHA. The RMP focuses on the outside community and environment and is controlled by the EPA.

In 1990 the Chemical Safety and Hazard Investigation Board (CSB) was established by Congress, though it did not become operational until 1998. The Board's mission is to determine the root causes of chemical accidents and issue safety recommendations to prevent future chemical accidents. Note that the CSB does not issue fines or citations since the Congress designed the agency to be non-regulatory. It also organizes workshops on a number of issues related to preparing for, preventing, and responding to chemical accidents.

=== United Nations ===
To prevent Chemical Accidents around the Globe the United Nations has put forth many regulatory and precautionary action thru their environmental protection branch. They have put forth the process of CAPP, Chemical Action Prevention and Preparedness. The three main goals of CAPP are to increase countries' understanding of chemical accidents, Increase the capabilities of environmental agencies in other countries, and help countries develop their own CAPP programs.

=== United Kingdom ===
The United Kingdom has one agency specializing in chemical exposures the UKHSA, their priority is to identify and strengthen capabilities relating to chemical exposures. The UKHSA has two tools the NSRA, National Security Risk Assessment and the NRR, National Risk Register both these agencies identify chemical hazards and risk which helps inform the UKHSA.

=== China ===
Chinas chemical industry is a trillion-dollar industry, and it has been the world's largest since 2011. Many different industrial chemicals have been shifted thru China increasing the risk and severity of chemical accidents, so China devolved the China Chemical Safety and Technology Association. This agency was in charge of Chinas chemical industry however as the need for more specialized assistance became required the agency became the China Chemical Safety Association. This agency solely focuses on chemical accidents and their effects.

== See also ==
- Chemical safety
- Process safety
- Process safety management
