= Piping corrosion circuit =

Piping corrosion circuit or corrosion loop (Piping Circuitization and Corrosion Modelling), is carried out as part of either a risk-based inspection analysis (RBI) or Materials Operating Envelope analysis (MOE). It is the systematization of the piping components versus failure modes analysis into materials operating envelope. It groups piping materials / chemical make-up into systems / sub systems and assigns corrosion mechanisms. These are then monitored over the operating lifetime of the facility. This analysis is performed on circuit inspection results to determine and optimize circuit corrosion rates and measured thickness/dates for circuit components. Corrosion circuits are utilized in the Integrity Management Plan (IMP) which forms a part of the overall asset integrity management system and is an integral part of any RBI analysis. Many times a "system" will be a broad overview of the facilities process flow, broken by stream constituents, while a circuit level analysis breaks systems into smaller "circuits" that group common metallurgies, equal (or roughly equal) temperatures and pressures, and expected damage mechanisms.

== Background ==
It is carried out in order to:

- Manage the inspection of piping.
- Identifying piping systems/circuits and assign failure modes.
- Capture any changes due to those upgrades or design creep.
- Ensure that circuits are identified to indicate inspection points as well as facilitate the implementation of various inspection techniques.
- Identify potential damage mechanisms and their locations.

Typically, this is performed at the outset of any Mechanical Integrity program i.e. as the facility is built, modified and operated throughout its life. General Requirements of Circuitization:

- Use an experienced corrosion/materials engineer to define systems in each unit
- Define corrosion circuits within each system based on materials of construction, operating conditions and active damage mechanisms
- Circuit identification and naming convention is used for both API RBI and IDMS programs to provide linking and sharing inspection data
- Circuit corrosion rates are used in API RBI to calculate circuit risk
- Determine the circuit and component next inspection date and inspection effectiveness, including detailed inspection plan
- Review or Placement of CML/TML (Condition Monitoring Locations/Thickness Monitoring Locations) recommended by corrosion/materials engineer
- CML/TML installed and documented on piping isometric drawings

== See also ==
- Corrosion engineering
