= Integrated safe system of work =

Integrated safe system of work (ISSOW) is used in hazardous industry to request, review, approve and document tasks to be carried out by frontline workers. It integrates permit-to-work, risk assessment and isolation management under a single electronic system, providing safety improvements to the user.

Thought to have originated in the North Sea upstream oil industry it was actually used several years before within the Power Industry, ISSoW software now forms a significant segment of the enterprise software market.

== History ==
ISSOW has now become synonymous with electronic permit-to-work (e-PTW). The North Sea began adopting several ISSOW suppliers in 2000s, when it was first rolled out to BP's North Everest Platform. From there a number of the major operators in the North Sea oil industry started to adopt this electronic safety system.

As of 2012, around 80% of the North Sea use an ISSOW product in some form or another, as it is widely recognised as a key frontline safety system. Between 2001 and present, ISSOW began to be utilised by some of the major operators including, but not limited to, Shell, Exxon Mobil, BG Group, and Chevron. ISSOW systems are used in oil & gas industry around the world.

== See also ==
- Process safety
- Risk assessment
