= PTW =

PTW may refer to:

- Paper Thin Walls, an American band
- PTW Architects, best known for designing the Beijing National Aquatics Center
- Heritage Field Airport
- Poison the Well, a musical group from Florida
- The Pychkine-Tews-Weinmann attack used to defeat Wired Equivalent Privacy encryption.
- Permit-to-work
- Pay-to-win
