= Layers of protection analysis =

Technique for evaluating hazards in systems

Layers of protection analysis (LOPA) is a technique for evaluating the hazards, risks and layers of protection associated with a system, such as a chemical process plant. In terms of complexity and rigour LOPA lies between qualitative techniques such as hazard and operability studies (HAZOP) and quantitative techniques such as fault trees and event trees. LOPA is used to identify scenarios that present the greatest risk and assists in considering how that risk could be reduced.

== Introduction ==
LOPA is a risk assessment technique that uses rules to evaluate the frequency of an initiating event, the independent protection layers (IPL), and the consequences of the event. LOPA aims to identify the countermeasures available against the potential consequences of a risk. An IPL is a device, system or action that prevents a scenario from escalating. The effectiveness of an IPL is quantified by its probability of failure on demand (PFD), in the range 0 to 1. An IPL must be independent of the other protective layers and its functionality must be capable of validation.

LOPA was developed in the 1990s in the chemical process industry but has found wider application. In functional safety, LOPA is often used to allocate a safety integrity level to instrumented protective functions. When this occurs in the context of the analysis of process plants, LOPA generally leverages the results of a preceding HAZOP. LOPA is complementary to HAZOP and can generate a second in-depth analysis of a scenario, which can be used to challenge the HAZOP findings in terms of failure events and safeguards.

== Layers of protection in process plants ==
Safety protection systems for process plant typically comprises eight layers:

Layer of protection	Protection measure	Examples	Safeguards
Layer 1	Process design	Design to standards, inherently safer design	
Layer 2	Basic controls	Process controls, process alarms (yellow), operator supervision	
Layer 3	Critical alarms	Process alarms (red), operator intervention	Preventive safeguards
Layer 4	Automatic actions	SIS, Shutdown, emergency shutdown (ESD)	Preventive safeguards
Layer 5	Physical protection	Relief valves, fire and gas system	Preventive safeguards
Layer 6	Physical protection	Firewalls, bunds (local containment)	Mitigative safeguards
Layer 7	Plant emergency response	Emergency	Mitigative safeguards
Layer 8	Community emergency response	Warning, evacuation, emergency services	Mitigative safeguards

LOPA is used to determine how a process deviation can lead to a hazardous event if not interrupted by an IPL.

== The LOPA procedure ==
LOPA is a risk assessment undertaken on a 'one cause–one consequence' pair. The steps of a LOPA risk assessment are:

1. Identify the consequences, using a risk matrix
2. Define the risk tolerance criteria (RTC), based on the tolerable/intolerable regions on the risk matrix
3. Define the relevant accident scenario, e.g. mechanical or human failure
4. Determine the initiating event frequency, again using the risk matrix
5. Identify the conditions and estimate the probability of failure on demand (PFD)
6. Estimate the frequency of unmitigated consequences
7. Identify the IPLs and estimate the PFD for each one
8. Determine the frequency of mitigated consequences
9. Evaluate the need for additional IPLs.

Example risk matrix for frequencies and consequences
			Consequences			
Effect on reputation			Negligible	Marginal	Critical	Catastrophic
Cost (indicative)			$0.1m	$1.0m	$10m	≥$50m
Frequency	Improbable	1/100/yr	Low	Medium	Medium	Serious
Frequency	Remote	1/50/yr	Low	Medium	Medium	Serious
Frequency	Occasional	1/10/yr	Low	Medium	Serious	High
Frequency	Probable	1/2/yr	Medium	Serious	High	High
Frequency	Frequent	1/½/yr	Medium	Serious	High	High

== Other uses ==
Although the LOPA methodology started in the process industry, the technique can be used in other fields, including:

- General design
- Management of change
- Facilities siting risk
- Mechanical integrity programs
- Incident investigations
- Screening tool for Quantified Risk Assessment (QRA)

== See also ==
- Hazard and operability study
- Hazard analysis
- Fault tree analysis
- Risk assessment
