= Corrosion loop =

Corrosion-analysis tool

Corrosion loop(s) are systematized analysis "loops" used during Risk-based inspection analysis. Both terms “RBI Corrosion loops” or “RBI corrosion circuits” are generic terms used to indicate the systematization of piping systems into usable and understandable parts associated with corrosion. Systematized piping loops or circuits are systems used in Risk Based Inspection analysis to assess the likelihood and consequence of failure. Other systematization may also prove useful, such as, i.e. inspection, consequence, materials of construction and chemistry. The system (or sub systems) maybe used to identify, pressure / temperature, subsequent failure mechanism and possible failure rate. They may be based upon Construction drawings, Process Flow diagrams or Piping & Instrument diagrams as required. Each loop or circuit maybe identified using a unique code, with description about; process, material & degradation mode, material, cladding, C.A, specs. See system model comes under the general heading of system analysis the terms analysis and synthesis come from Greek where they mean respectively "to take apart" and "to put together". See also systems theory: Note the exact definition of the systematized risk analysis " loop" is left to the reader and their requirements of the system analysis required, however to ensure consistency and that the expected results is produced, this should be defined before they are constructed. It is suggested that a “true” corrosion loop should be a grouping were the degradation mechanism is "likely" to be the same i.e.

- Material of Construction,
- Process fluid (similar stream properties),
- Temperature (roughly, or at least within the damage mechanisms susceptibility thresholds),
- Pressure (if the damage mechanism/s of concern is/are reliant upon pressure), and
- Velocity (if the damage mechanism of concern is reliant upon velocity).

By defining the barrier limits of Damage Susceptible Areas, the susceptibility of any part is similar to that of the whole.
