= Risk-based inspection =

Optimal maintenance process in industrial plants

Risk-based inspection (RBI) is an optimal maintenance business process used to prioritize inspection of equipment such as pressure vessels, heat exchangers, and piping in industrial plants based on API 581. RBI is a decision-making methodology for optimizing inspection plans. The RBI concept lies in that the risk of failure can be assessed in relation to a level that is acceptable, and inspection and repair used to ensure that the level of risk is below that acceptance limit. It examines the health, safety and environment and business risk of ‘active’ and ‘potential’ damage mechanisms to assess and rank failure probability and consequence. This ranking is used to optimize inspection intervals based on site-acceptable risk levels and operating limits, while mitigating risks as appropriate. RBI analysis can be qualitative, quantitative or semi-quantitative in nature.

Probability of failure is estimated on the basis of the types of degradation mechanisms operating in the component. It is calculated as the area of overlap between the distributions of the degradation rate for each degradation mechanism (based on uncertainties in rate) with the distribution of the resistance of the component to failure.

Consequence of failure is defined for all consequences that are of importance, such as safety, economy and environment. Consequence of failure is evaluated as the outcome of a failure based on the assumption that such a failure will occur.

Accuracy is a function of analysis methodology, data quality and consistency of execution. Precision is a function of the selected metrics and computational methods. Risk presented as a single numeric value (as in a quantitative analysis) does not guarantee greater accuracy compared to a risk matrix (as in a qualitative analysis), because of uncertainty that is inherent with probabilities and consequences.

RBI is most often used in engineering industries and is predominant in the process industry (oil and gas, petrochemical, pharmaceutical, power generation). Assessed risk levels are used to develop a prioritized inspection plan. It is related to (or sometimes a part of) risk-based asset management, risk-based integrity management, and risk-based management. Generally, RBI is part of risk and reliability management. The basis of most RBI programs is the corrosion circuit, in which each circuit can be compared for relative risk levels to aid in inspection and maintenance planning.

Inspections typically employ non-destructive testing.

== Prioritization ==
Items with high probability and high consequence (i.e. high risk) are given a higher priority for inspection than items that are high probability but for which failure has low consequences. This strategy allows for a rational investment of inspection resources.

== Objectives ==
RBI assists a company to select cost effective and appropriate maintenance and inspection tasks and techniques, to minimize efforts and cost, to shift from a reactive to a proactive maintenance regime, to produce an auditable system, to give an agreed-upon operating window, and to implement a risk management tool.

The purposes of RBI include:

1. To improve risk management results
2. To provide a holistic, interdependent approach for managing risks
3. To apply a strategy of doing what is needed for safeguarding integrity and improving reliability and availability of the asset by planning and executing those inspections that are needed
4. To reduce inspections and shutdowns and provide longer run length without compromising safety or reliability
5. To safeguard integrity
6. To reduce the risk of failures
7. To increase plant availability and reduce unplanned outages
8. To provide a flexible technique able to continuously improve and adopt to changing risks
9. To ensure inspection techniques and methods consider potential failure modes

== Standards ==
International engineering standards and recommended practices outline requirements, methodologies and the implementation of RBI.

- EN 16991: Risk-based inspection framework
- API 580: Risk-Based Inspection - Recommended Practice (Third edition, February 2016)
- API 581: Risk Based Inspection Methodology - Recommended Practice (Third edition, April 2016)
- ASME PCC-3: Inspection Planning Using Risk-Based Methods
- DNV-RP G101: Risk Based Inspection Of Offshore Topsides Static Mechanical Equipment
- EEMUA 159: Chapter 17 - RBI methodology for aboveground storage tanks
- EPRI TR-112657: Revised Risk-Informed Inservice Inspection Evaluation
- NCHRP Report 782: Proposed Guideline for Reliability-Based Bridge Inspection Practices
