= Integrity Management Plan =

Integrity Management Plan (part of an asset integrity management system) is a documented and systematic approach to ensure the long-term integrity of an asset or assets.

Integrity management planning is a process for assessing and mitigating risks in an effort to reduce both the likelihood and consequences of incidents.

Asset integrity plans are maintained and reviewed regularly so that they:

- Optimize operational and capital expenditures
- Ensure adoption of best-in-class practices
- Assist management of risk
- Increase shareholder, senior management, regulator and public confidence
- Identify risks, conducting assessments, taking preventive actions and implementing mitigate measures

An effective IMP should contain:

- A process outline – details the process envelope (temperature pressure and velocity) in which the system operates and any critical parameters that must be followed. Also states process chemistry and contaminants that are encountered
- A threat identification list- Information about the asset segments are evaluated to identify the threats of concerns to the asset and to assess risk
- A Risk Analysis – a systematic process, in which potential hazards from facility operation are identified, and the likelihood and consequences of potential adverse events are estimated
- Detailed Regulatory Requirements – details the applicable regulatory standards to be met and the methods used to comply with those standards
- A Responsibility assignment matrix – details the persons responsible, accountable for any tasks to comply with the requirements of the plan. It also states those who should be communicated to and Informed
- Corrosion circuits – showing the system broken down into corrosion circuits shows damage mechanisms, materials of construction and process chemistry
- Damage frequency (statistics) rates of decay
- Critical operating parameters for process safety
- Mitigation techniques, frequency, condition monitoring, inspections and process monitoring requirements
- Historic review of asset condition to-date
- Knowledge gap analysis, missing information, manufacturer's data report (MDR), review drawings etc.
- Previous failure analysis review
- Design drawing review, materials of construction (initial)
- Management of change review, alterations and repairs carried out
- Remediation – repairs techniques considered

Also:

- Record keeping
- Performance plan
- Communication plan
- Regular Interaction
- Management of change
- Prevention and Mitigation measures
- How to conduct assessments / frequency / audit of system

The Integrity Management Plan (IMP) forms a part of the overall asset integrity management system and is audited as per the Integrity Engineering Audit (IEA).

Particularly post the Deepwater Horizon oil spill, the role of asset integrity has never been more critical to the global oil and gas business. Not only can a well-managed asset integrity plan help operators identify and reduce safety risks before they escalate but focusing on asset integrity can also play a major role in both achieving operational excellence and extending the life of ageing assets. See also

- Asset integrity management systems
