= Permit-to-work =

Work safety management system

Permit-to-work (PTW) refers to a management system procedure used to ensure that work is done safely and efficiently. It is used in hazardous industries, such as process and nuclear plants, usually in connection with maintenance work. It involves procedured request, review, authorization, documenting and, most importantly, de-conflicting of tasks to be carried out by front line workers. It ensures affected personnel are aware of the nature of the work and the hazards associated with it, all safety precautions have been put in place before starting the task, and the work has been completed correctly.

== Implementation ==
Instructions or procedures are often adequate for most work activities, but some require extra care. A permit-to-work system is a formal system stating exactly what work is to be done, where, and when.

Permit-to-work is an essential part of control of work (CoW), a structured communication mechanism to reliably communicate information about hazards, control measures, and so on. During critical maintenance activities, good communication between management, supervisors, operators, and maintenance staff and contractors is essential.

Permit-to-work is also a core element of integrated safe system of work (ISSOW) systems, that along with risk assessment and isolation planning, enable as low as reasonably practicable (ALARP) reduction of unsafe activities in non-trivial work environments. Permit-to-work adherence is essential in process safety management.

Examples of high-risk jobs where a written permit-to-work procedure may need to be used include hot work (such as welding), confined space entry, cutting into pipes carrying hazardous substances (breaking containment), diving in the vicinity of intake openings, and work that requires electrical or mechanical isolation.

A permit-to-work is not a replacement for robust risk assessment, but can help provide context for the risk of the work to be done. Studies by the U.K. Health and Safety Executive have shown that the most significant cause of maintenance-related accidents in the U.K. chemical industry was a failure to implement effective permit-to-work systems. Common failures in control of work systems are a failure to follow the permit-to-work or isolation management procedures, risk assessments that are not suitable and sufficient to identify the risks, and/or the control measures and a combination of the two.

PTW is a means of coordinating different work activities to avoid conflicts. Its implementation usually involves the use of incompatible operations matrices to manage simultaneous operations (SIMOPS), thus preventing conflicting short-term activities of different workgroups that may present hazardous interference. For example, PTW can preclude one workgroup welding or grinding in the vicinity of another venting explosive or flammable gases.

A responsible person should assess the work and check safety at each stage. The people doing the job sign the permit to show that they understand the risks and precautions necessary. Ideally one person should be delegated with the responsibility of PTW authorization at any one time, and all workers at the facility should be fully aware of who that person is and when the responsibility is transferred.

A permit to work form typically contains these items:

- The work to be done, the equipment to be used and the personnel involved.
- Precautions to be taken when performing the task.
- Other workgroups to be informed of work being performed in their area.
- Authorisation for work to commence.
- Duration that the permit is valid.
- Method to extend the permit for an additional period.
- Witness mechanism that all work has been complete and the worksite restored to a clean, safe condition.
- Actions to be taken in an emergency.

Once a PTW has been issued to a workgroup, a lock-out tag-out system is used to restrict equipment state changes such as valve operations until the work specified in the permit is complete. Since the permit-to-work is the primary de-conflictation tool, all non-routine work activities in high-risk environments should have a PTW.

Historically, permit-to-work has been paper-based. Electronic permit-to-work (ePTW) systems have been developed since the early 1980s as an alternative to paper permit-to-work methods.

== Historical examples of manual permit to work failures ==
USS Guitarro, a submarine of the United States Navy, sank when two independent work groups repeatedly flooded ballast tanks in an attempt to achieve conflicting objectives of zero trim and two degree bow-up trim; a result of failing to have a single person aware of and authorising all simultaneous activities by a permit to work system.

HMS Artemis, a submarine of the Royal Navy, sank when activities of ballast management and watertight integrity were uncontrolled and without oversight.

Occidental Petroleum's Piper Alpha platform was destroyed on 6 July 1988 in an explosion and fire, after a shift reinstated a system left partially disassembled by the previous shift. 167 men died in this incident due to the failure to properly communicate permit state at shift handover.

== Examples of legislative and industry association guidelines ==
- Australia: Commonwealth Law - Offshore Petroleum Safety Case.
- United Kingdom: Health and Safety Executive - Permit to Work Systems.
- United States: Occupational Safety and Health Administration - Process Safety Management.
- European Industrial Gases Association: Work Permit Systems, Doc. 40/02/E.
