= 2017 Arkema plant explosion =

2017 industrial disaster in Crosby, Texas

Coordinates: 29.9485°N 95.0223°W

The 2017 Arkema plant explosion was an industrial disaster that took place during Hurricane Harvey in Crosby, Texas. Flooding from the hurricane disabled the refrigeration system at the plant which manufactured organic peroxides. The unrefrigerated organic peroxides decomposed and self-ignited.

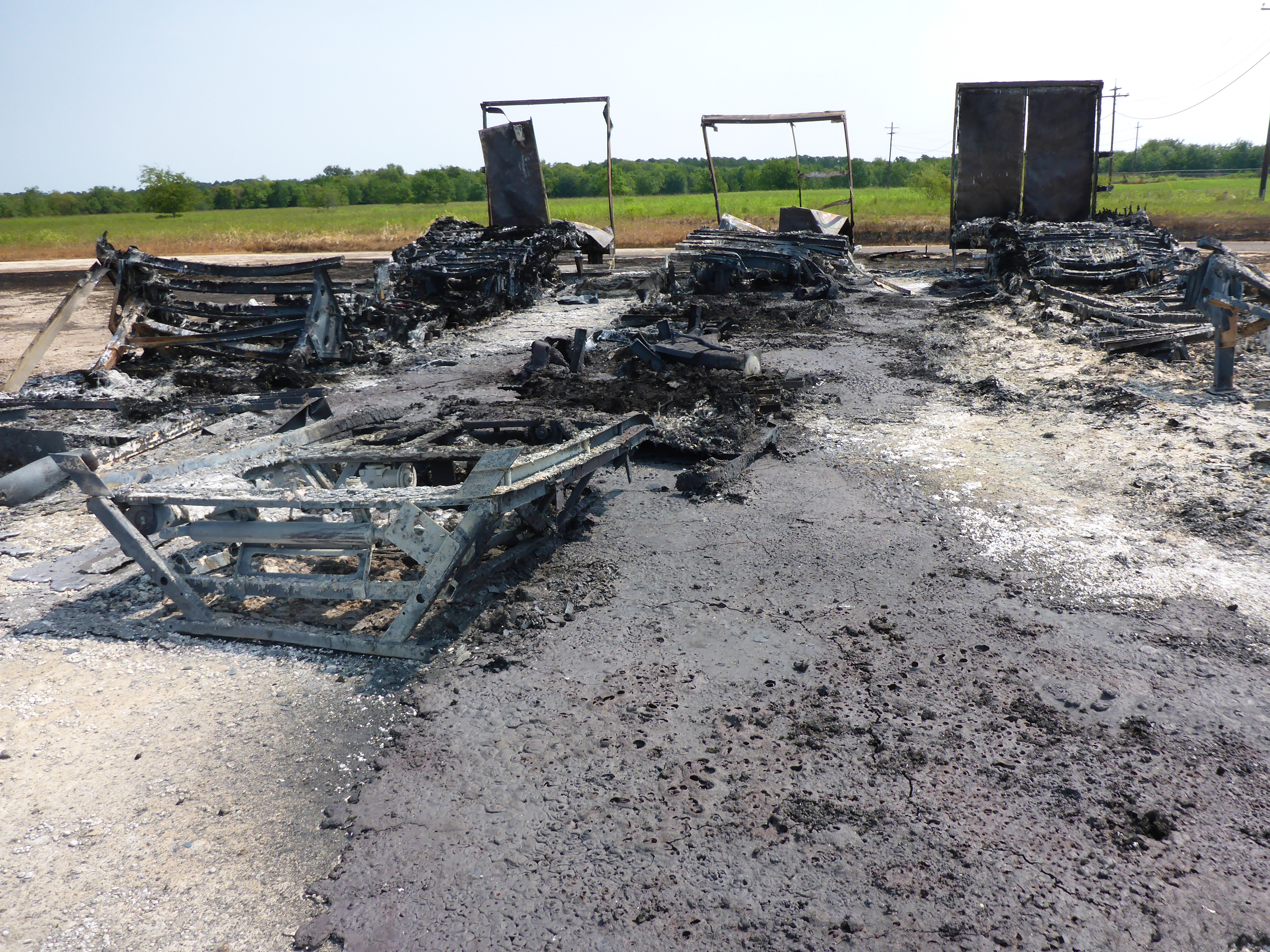
Burned containers at the Arkema site

== Arkema Crosby plant ==
The Arkema plant is located in Crosby, Texas with a staff of approximately 50 workers, and produces 30 types of organic peroxide products. The plant was constructed in 1960, by Wallace & Tiernan. A 1969 merger with Pennsalt created Pennwalt, who owned the plant until it was acquired by Elf Aquitaine in 1990. In 2004, Arkema Inc was formed, and took possession of the facility.

The earliest floodplain map located in the Chemical Safety Board investigation, was from September 1985, and indicated the plant was in "Zone C - Area of Minimal Flooding". A November 1996 update to the floodplain map, placed most of the facility into "Other Areas - Zone X - Areas determined to be outside the 500-year floodplain". However, a June 2007 update floodplain map now indicated most of the facility was inside of 100-year floodplain, including the storage warehouses, backup generators and electrical transformers for commercial power. A smaller area of the facility was within the 500-year floodplain.

The organic peroxides are stored in nine storage buildings. Seven of these buildings are Low Temperature Warehouses, kept at −20 to 0 °F (−29 to −18 °C). One building is kept at ambient temperature and the largest storage building contained multiple compartments kept at various temperatures ranging from 40 °F (4 °C) to ambient temperature. The Low Temperature Warehouses contain two refrigeration systems: mechanical refrigeration units, powered by electricity and a liquid nitrogen system not reliant on electricity.

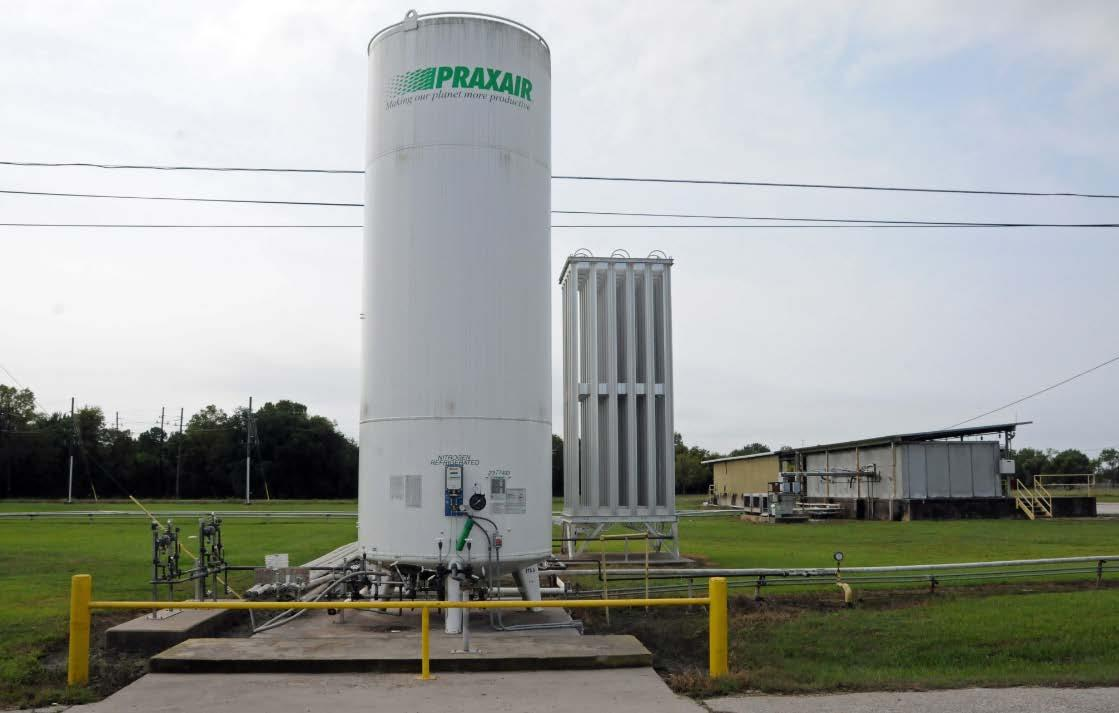
A liquid nitrogen tank intended to provide backup refrigeration

Additionally, refrigerated trailers were used by Arkema as a final emergency backup and when warehouse refrigeration systems need to be shut down for maintenance work. When filled with a full tank of fuel, the trailers could keep the organic peroxides at a safe temperature for more than one week.

Arkema stored and transported the organic peroxides in plastic 1 US gallon (3.8 L) or 5 US gallons (19 L) containers. These were typically stacked on pallets and shrink-wrapped together.

A 2016 analysis done by the Houston Chronicle and Texas A&M identified the Arkema facility as a facility posing a high potential for harm to the public. The analysis and subsequent series by the newspaper revealed major flaws in the regulation of chemical facilities in the U.S.

In February 2017, OSHA issued safety fines regarding general safety and maintenance in the sum of $91,724.

== Timeline ==
=== Thursday, 24 August, 2017 ===
At 10 am, Central Daylight Time (CDT), following warnings from the National Hurricane Center that predicted widespread flooding with rainfall of 15–25 inches (380–640 mm). In the town of Crosby, where the plant was based, forecasts expected 15–18 inches (380–460 mm) in the town of Crosby. Using experiences from past storms, staff at the facility determined that a 'ride-out crew' (Note: The ride-out crew is a group of staff assigned to remain at the facility during the duration of the hurricane, tasked with ensuring safety of the facility and monitoring the facility and conditions within it. The crew consisted of twelve members: 2 management, 4 operators, 1 refrigeration specialist, 3 maintenance, and 2 electrician/mechanic.) would likely be needed at the plant, as the flooding predicted 1 to 2 feet (0.30 to 0.61 m) of floodwaters would render local roads impassible. However, it was believed that while the facility would suffer some flooding that would make travel between buildings difficult, the safety, refrigeration and standby electrical systems would be unaffected by the flooding.

=== Friday, 25 August ===
Revisions to weather forecasts raised the expected rainfall to 15–25 inches (380–640 mm) with some areas seeing rainfall amounts of 35 inches (890 mm). With flooding of local roads now certain, the ride-out crew was activated. Staff were still confident the facility would have no issues with maintaining refrigeration of organic peroxides on site. During the day, production was discontinued, and staff prepared the facility for Harvey's arrival, securing loose materials, moving portable equipment that could be damaged by flooding, preparing storm equipment, such as an off-road forklift, ensuring fuel tanks were filled and reducing waste water levels in expectation of the significant rain.

At 10 pm CDT, Harvey made landfall 30 miles (48 km) northeast of Corpus Christi, Texas. At this time, the National Hurricane Center released another forecast, which now called for rainfall of 15–30 inches (380–760 mm) with isolated amounts up to 40 inches (1,000 mm).

=== Saturday, 26 August ===
Gauge station 1740 recorded a 13 feet (4.0 m) increase in the Cedar Bayou Stream's water level, during the day. (Note: The Cedar Bayou Stream forms part of the Cedar Bayou watershed, which the facility is located inside of.) Meanwhile, the ride-out crew monitored the facility. Towards the end of the day, they determined preempted electrical shutdowns would be needed to reduce danger of equipment damage and electrocution. During the evening, landline phones failed and water continued to rise, surrounding the Low Temperature Warehouses, where the organic peroxides were stored.

=== Sunday, 27 August ===
At 10 am CDT, the National Hurricane Center updated its forecast, calling for an additional rainfall 15–25 inches (380–640 mm) and up to 50 inches (1,300 mm) over the next several days.

Early in the day, the ride-out crew shut down electricity to several Low Temperature Warehouses. Organic peroxides in these warehouses were transferred into refrigerated trailers. The ride-out crew was optimistic that flooding would crest. In addition to the Low Temperature Warehouses, power was also cut off to other structures, the water supply and fire suppression pumps. Additionally some of the backup electrical generators were also compromised by floodwaters, along with the piping for the emergency liquid nitrogen tank that was on hand should the mechanical (electrically powered) refrigeration fail. Workers were able to restore this temporarily, however the piping was later submerged again by floodwaters.

By the end of the night, only one Low Temperature Warehouse was still operational, with the organic peroxides from the other six warehouses now stored in six refrigerated trailers, now being stored in the 'laydown area' one of the highest points in the facility.

=== Monday, 28 August ===
At 2 am CDT, commercial power was lost, when transformers were flooded. The two remaining standby generators were activated to continue providing electricity to the last Low Temperature Warehouse. However, one of these generators was quickly flooded. At 3 am CDT, the ride-out crew began transferring the organic peroxides in the last warehouse into two refrigerated trailers, fearing loss of the last remaining generator. Two hours later, at 5 am CDT, the last generator was turned off by the ride-out crew. Later that morning, they also discovered that the nitrogen tank was also now inoperable after the piping had become submerged again.

Throughout the morning, the forklift and two trucks were lost to rising floodwaters, stranding three trailers by the Low Temperature Warehouses. Water in this area had reached chest height on the ride-out crew. This left around 50 pallets of organic peroxide in the last warehouse. The ride-out crew hand carried the small containers by hand, through the floodwaters, to refrigerated trailers at an adjacent building to keep them cool, finishing this task around midnight.

At this point, three trailers, containing 4,000 containers were still sitting in the floodwaters. The ride-out crew was concerned that these trailers would fail and the organic peroxide would begin to warm.

=== Tuesday, 29 August ===
The ride-out crew discovered one of the refrigerated trailers that could not be moved from the warehouses had started to lean, and likely going to fail. Additionally, the Arkema corporate crisis team suspected there would be at least one fire caused by decomposition of the organic peroxides, and decided to have the ride-out crew evacuate the facility. After a final inspection by boat, the ride-out crew was evacuated by Harris County emergency responders by boat around 12:00pm CDT.

At some point during the day, the secondary containment dikes around the wastewater tanks were overcome by floodwaters, and two tanks released approximately 23,000 pounds (10,000 kg) of organic materials mixed with floodwaters and escaped the facility.

Due to the likelihood of a fire from the decomposing organic peroxides, emergency personnel established a 1.5 miles (2.4 km) evacuation zone around the plant, and evacuated approximately 205 residents from this area. Notably, this evacuation area included U.S. Highway 90, one of the few major roads that remained not impacted by flooding.

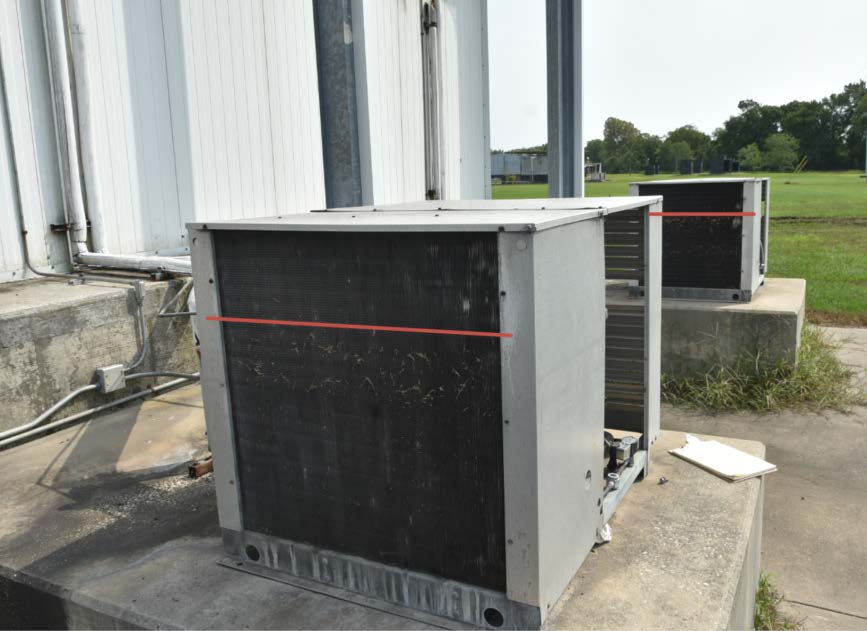
Image released by the CSB showing the final flood level

=== Wednesday, August 30 ===
A Unified Command was set up at the Crosby fire station, to coordinate the response to the eventual fire at the facility, consisting of Arkema personnel, various environmental agencies, and fire departments. Roadblocks and air monitoring stations were put into place at the edges of the evacuation zone.

Due to the flooding of Interstate 10, emergency personnel continued to use U.S. Highway 90, as closing the U.S. 90 would have resulted in a multi-hour detour, effectively cutting off Houston from Beaumont.

Near midnight, two police officers traveling along U.S. 90 entered the evacuation area at the northern end, and eventually entered a "large cloud of gas" near the Arkema plant. The officers turned around, and retreated back to the northern edge of the evacuation zone, having irritation to their eyes, skin and respiratory systems. The officers closed the highway, and reported the cloud to the Unified Command.

=== Thursday, August 31 ===
Just after midnight, Arkema personnel reviewed data from sensors from six of the nine trailers. (Note: Three of the trailers were not fitted with equipment to remotely communicate temperatures in the trailer.) The data showed no indications of a temperature increase within these six trailers. Firefighters were sent out to the facility, but failed to observe any signs of organic peroxide decomposition. At 12:30am CDT, U.S. Highway 90 was reopened by Unified Command. CSB investigators suspect that the chemical cloud may have originated in one of the three trailers not fitted with equipment to remotely report temperature data.

Several police officers drove U.S. 90 from the northern edge of the evacuation zone, and entered a cloud of gas. Upon reaching the southern end of the evacuation zone, multiple officers reported nausea and headaches. Additionally, emergency medical technicians called to assist the police officers, drove through the cloud. Twenty-one first responders were taken to a local hospital for examination due to exposure to smoke. Unified Command closed U.S. 90 until 4 September.

At 2 am CDT, the contents of the refrigerated trailer that had tipped, decomposed and ignited the trailer.

=== Friday, 1 September ===
At 10 am CDT, Harris County helicopters surveyed the facility and noticed the eight remaining trailers were stable and showing no signs of decomposition. However, around 5:00pm CDT two more trailers caught on fire, both of which were located in floodwaters near the Low Temperature Warehouses. The six remaining trailers, all located in the higher 'laydown area' showed no signs of decomposition.

=== Saturday, 2 September ===
The six trailers in the 'laydown area' were still intact. A survey flight conducted around 1:20pm CDT determined a trailer had lost its cooling capacity. Infrared images determined one of the trailers was leaking a substance that was at an elevated temperature, that was suspected to be a byproduct of decomposition of the organic peroxides.

At 7 pm CDT Unified Command and Arkema decided to carry out a controlled burn of the remaining trailers. However, a storage tank filled with isobutylene was located about 40 yards (37 m) away. It was decided that the burn would be conducted with the trailer closest to the tank being left until last, to use it as a heat shield while burning the other trailers.

=== Sunday, 3 September ===
A survey flight in the morning revealed more materials leaking from the trailers. Responders met at 10 am CDT to reevaluate the plan, and ultimately decided to move forward with it. At 12:45 the plan was started, with an entry team confirming no leaking decomposed organic peroxides were near the isobutylene tank. It was confirmed the leaking material was not near the tank, and at 3:40pm CDT, the controlled burn was started.

At 9 pm CDT air monitoring was conducted in the evacuation zone, which showed no elevated readings of hazardous gases.

=== Monday, September 4 ===
At 1 am CDT, Unified Command ended the evacuation order, allowing residents back into their homes and reopened U.S. Highway 90.

== Floodwater contamination ==
In addition to the explosions, two wastewater tanks overflowed during the storm, releasing more than 23,000 pounds of contaminants that were carried by floodwaters into nearby homes. Noxious toxins including heavy metals, polycyclic aromatic hydrocarbons, dioxins and semi-volatile organic compounds have been identified in homes and soil in neighborhoods near the plant. It is uncertain what proportion of the chemical residues originated in gases released by the plant, and what proportion flowed out of the flooded wastewater tanks.

== Investigations ==
=== Chemical Safety Board ===
On Thursday, August 31, 2017, the same day as the first fire, the U.S. Chemical Safety Board announced an investigation. This report concluded on 24 May 2018.

The report made five recommendations, directed at four entities:

- Reduce flood risk to as low as reasonably practicable (ALARP). Ensure that any safeguards for flooding meet independent layer of protection requirements. (Arkema Crosby Facility)
- Within 18 months, develop a policy requiring that Arkema and its subsidiaries that manufacture organic peroxides or that have processes which involve more than the threshold quantities of highly hazardous chemicals (HHC) periodically (corresponding with PHA cycle), analyze such facilities to determine whether they are at risk for extreme weather events such as hurricanes or floods. (Arkema Inc.)
- Establish corporate requirements for its facilities that manufacture organic peroxides or that have processes which involve more than the threshold quantities of highly hazardous chemicals (HHC) to ensure that critical safeguards, such as backup power, function as intended during extreme weather events, including hurricanes or floods. (Arkema Inc.)
- Develop broad and comprehensive guidance to help companies assess their U.S. facility risk from all types of potential extreme weather events. Guidance should address the issues identified in this report and cover actions required to prepare for extreme weather, resiliency and protection of physical infrastructure and personnel during extreme weather, as well as recovery operations following an extreme weather event, where appropriate. (Center for Chemical Process Safety (CCPS))
- Update your emergency operations training using lessons learned from the Arkema incident to help ensure that personnel enforcing evacuation perimeters are not harmed by exposure to hazardous chemical releases. Update existing protocols and revise training curricula to include the use of analytical tools, air monitoring, and personal protective equipment, to provide appropriate protection when emergency equipment or personnel need to be moved through an evacuation zone during a hazardous materials release. Include a process for periodic refresher training. (Harris County, Texas)

As of January 2020, the Chemical Safety Board classifies the three recommendations made to Arkema Inc/Arkema Crosby Facility as 'Open - Awaiting Response or Evaluation/Approval of Response (O - ARE/AR)'. (Note: The recipient has not submitted a substantive response, or the evaluation by CSB staff of a response is pending, or the Board has not yet acted on staff recommendation of status.) The recommendations sent to Harris County and CCPS are marked as 'Open - Acceptable Response or Alternate Response (O - ARAR)' (Note: Response by recipient indicates a planned action that would satisfy the objective of the recommendation when implemented, including a written timetable for completion.)

=== Other investigations ===
The Environmental Protection Agency began formally asking questions of Arkema on September 7, 2017.

== Fight over public records ==
When Arkema North American CEO Richard Rowe announced at a press conference that nothing could prevent an explosion at the Crosby facility, reporters requested documents about the plant. The company repeatedly refused to disclose detailed chemical inventories, facility maps and other documents about the Crosby site to the public, citing concerns about terrorism.

Many of the documents were later released to reporters after Freedom of Information requests. Arkema's 2016 and 2017 detailed chemical inventories, also known as Tier IIs, remain secret.

== Legal proceedings ==
In September 2017, emergency workers who responded to the explosion filed a lawsuit against the plant for damage to their health caused by the negligence of plant management.

A civil attorney for Harris County (Houston area) later announced an investigation into the incident at Arkema, followed by a criminal indictment of CEO Richard Rowe and former plant manager Leslie Comardelle for the reckless release of toxic chemicals. In October 2020, however, these charges were dismissed by a Harris County judge.
