= Health Protection Research Unit =

Health Protection Research Units (HPRU), established in 2014, are British research organisations attached to a university partnered with initially Public Health England and later with UK Health Security Agency.

List of HPRUs in England
NIHR HPRU	Notes	References
Behavioural Science and Evaluation at the University of Bristol		
Blood Borne and Sexually Transmitted Infections at University College London		
Chemical and Radiation Threats and Hazards at Imperial College London		
Emergency Preparedness and Response at King’s College London		
Emerging and Zoonotic Infections at University of Liverpool		
Environmental Change and Health at London School of Hygiene and Tropical Medicine		
Environmental Exposures and Health at Imperial College London		
Gastrointestinal Infections at University of Liverpool		
Genomics and Enabling Data at Warwick University		
Healthcare Associated Infections and Antimicrobial Resistance at Imperial College London		
Healthcare Associated Infections and Antimicrobial Resistance at University of Oxford		
Modelling and Health Economics at Imperial College London		
Respiratory Infections at Imperial College London		
Vaccines and Immunisation at London School of Hygiene and Tropical Medicine		
