= Hazard analysis =

Method for assessing risk

A hazard analysis is one of many methods that may be used to assess risk. At its core, the method entails describing a system object (such as a person or machine) that intends to conduct some activity. During the performance of that activity, a potential source of harm (referred to as a “factor” or hazard) may be encountered that could cause or contribute to an occurrence (mishap, incident, accident, hazardous event). Finally, that occurrence will result in some outcome that may be measured in terms of the degree of loss or harm. This outcome may be measured on a continuous scale, such as an amount of monetary loss, or the outcomes may be categorized into various levels of severity e.g. environmental damage, personal injury, or reputational damage etc.

== A Simple Hazard Analysis ==
The first step in hazard analysis is to identify the potential source of harm. If an automobile is an object performing an activity such as driving over a bridge, the potential source of harm may be the icy road condition may be icy. If this hazard is encountered, it could cause or contribute to the occurrence of an automobile accident, and the outcome of that occurrence could range in severity from a minor fender-bender to a fatal accident.

== Managing Risk through Hazard Analysis ==
A hazard analysis may be used to inform which risk mitigation strategy: probability, occurrence, or outcome to pursue. For instance, the probability of encountering an icy bridge may be mitigated by adding salt such that the ice will melt. Or, a risk mitigation strategy may target the occurrence of the hazard. For instance, putting tire chains on a vehicle does not change the probability of a bridge becoming icy, but if an icy bridge is encountered, it improves traction, mitigating the chance of a sliding into another vehicle. Finally, risk may be managed by influencing the severity of outcomes. For instance, seatbelts and airbags do nothing to prevent bridges from becoming icy, nor do they prevent accidents caused by that ice. However, in the event of an accident, these devices lower the probability of the accident resulting in fatal or serious injuries.

== Software Hazard Analysis ==
IEEE STD-1228-1994 Software Safety Plans prescribes industry best practices for conducting software safety hazard analyses to help ensure safety requirements and attributes are defined and specified for inclusion in software that commands, controls or monitors critical functions. When software is involved in a system, the development and design assurance of that software is often governed by DO-178C. The severity of consequence identified by the hazard analysis establishes the criticality level of the software. Software criticality levels range from A to E, corresponding to the severity of Catastrophic to No Safety Effect. Higher levels of rigor are required for level A and B software with increasing functional tasks and work products.

In 2009 a leading edge commercial standard was promulgated based on decades of proven system safety processes in DoD and NASA. ANSI/GEIA-STD-0010-2009 (Standard Best Practices for System Safety Program Development and Execution) is a demilitarized commercial best practice that uses proven holistic, comprehensive and tailored approaches for hazard prevention, elimination and control. It is centered around the hazard analysis and functional based safety process.

== Severity category examples ==
When used as part of an aviation hazard analysis, "Severity" describes the outcome (the degree of loss or harm) that results from an occurrence (an aircraft accident or incident). When categorized, severity must be mutually exclusive such that every occurrence has one, and only one, associated severity category. The definitions must also be collectively exhaustive such that all defined occurrences fall into one of the severity categories. In the US, the FAA includes five severity categories as part of its safety risk management policy.

Severity	Definition
Severity 1 - Catastrophic	An expected unintentional effect that includes any of the following: 3 or more fatalities; Crewed aircraft hull loss with at least 1 fatality
Severity 2 - Hazardous	An expected unintentional effect that includes any of the following: 1-2 fatalities without crewed aircraft hull loss; Crewed aircraft hull loss without fatalities; 3 or more serious injuries
Severity 3 - Major	An expected unintentional effect that includes any of the following: 1-2 serious injuries; 3 or more minor injuries; Substantial damage to crewed aircraft; Hull loss to uncrewed aircraft > 55 lbs
Severity 4 - Minor	An expected unintentional effect that includes any of the following: 1-2 minor injuries; Minor damage to crewed aircraft; Substantial damage to uncrewed aircraft > 55 lbs
Severity 5 - Minimal	Negligible safety effect

Example medical devices severity categories and definitions when used as part of a comprehensive hazard analysis according to EN ISO 14971:2019 that can be used to presume conformity to the Medical Devices Directive.

Severity	Definition
Catastrophic	Results in death
Critical	Results in permanent impairment or life-threatening injury
Serious	Results in injury or impairment requiring professional medical intervention
Minor	Results in temporary injury or impairment not requiring professional medical intervention
Negligible	Results in temporary discomfort or inconvenience

== Likelihood category examples ==
When used as part of an aviation hazard analysis, a "Likelihood" is a specific probability. It is the joint probability of a hazard occurring, that hazard causing or contributing to an aircraft accident or incident, and the resulting degree of loss or harm falling within one of the defined severity categories. Thus, if there are five severity categories, each hazard may have five unique likelihoods. In the US, the FAA provides a continuous probability scale for measuring likelihood, but also includes seven likelihood categories as part of its safety risk management policy.

Likelihood	Definition
Likelihood A - Frequent	Probability < 1 but >= $1 \times 10^{-5}$
Likelihood B - Infrequent	Probability < $1 \times 10^{-5}$ but >= $1 \times 10^{-6}$
Likelihood C - Extremely Infrequent	Probability < $1 \times 10^{-6}$ but >= $1 \times 10^{-7}$
Likelihood D - Remote	Probability < $1 \times 10^{-7}$ but >= $1 \times 10^{-8}$
Likelihood E - Extremely Remote	Probability < $1 \times 10^{-8}$ but >= $1 \times 10^{-9}$
Likelihood F - Improbable	Probability < $1 \times 10^{-9}$ but >= $1 \times 10^{-10}$
Likelihood G - Extremely Improbable	Probability < $1 \times 10^{-10}$ but > 0

Example medical devices likelihood categories and definitions.

Likelihood	Definition
Frequent	≥ 10^{−3}
Probable	< 10^{−3} and ≥ 10^{−4}
Occasional	< 10^{−4} and ≥ 10^{−5}
Remote	< 10^{−5} and ≥ 10^{−6}
Improbable	< 10^{−6}

== See also ==
- Environmental hazard – Dangers to or dangers of environments
- Failure mode and effects analysis – Analysis of potential system failures
- Fault tree analysis – Failure analysis system used in safety engineering and reliability engineering
- Hazard and operability study (HAZOP) – Study of risks in a plan or operation
- Layers of protection analysis (LOPA) – Technique for evaluating the hazards, risks and layers of protection of a system
- Medical Device Risk Management - ISO 14971 – ISO standard
- Occupational safety and health – Field concerned with the safety, health and welfare of people at work
- Reliability engineering – Sub-discipline of systems engineering that emphasizes dependability
- RTCA DO-178B – RTCA standard for safety-critical software (Software Considerations in Airborne Systems and Equipment Certification)
- RTCA DO-178C – International aeronautics software standard
- RTCA DO-254 – Document for guidance of airborne electronic hardware (similar to DO-178B, but for hardware)
- SAE ARP4754 – Aerospace Practice (System development process)
- SAE ARP4761 – Aerospace recommended practice from SAE International (System safety assessment process)
- Safety engineering – Engineering discipline
- Structured what-if technique (SWIFT) – Method of prospective hazards analysis
