= Hot work =

Processes that can be a source of ignition or a fire hazard

Hot work refers to any process that involves open flames, sparks, or heat-producing tools and equipment. The term "hot work" is commonly used in industrial and regulatory contexts, often carrying specific safety and compliance requirements governed by fire codes and occupational safety standards. Hot work is most often done across a wide range of industries ranging from assembly of circuit boards together to large scale industrial style labor such as maintenance shops, shipbuilding, and manufacturing to name a few.

Common hot work processes involve welding, soldering, cutting, brazing and the use of powder-actuated tools or similar fire producing operations. These processes produce sparks or heat which can ignite flammable materials around the work area or flammable gases and vapors in the workspace. Due to the risks involved, workplace fires associated with hot work are often start because the work area contained combustible material or inadequate ventilation while the hot work was being performed.

== Types of hot work ==
=== Welding ===
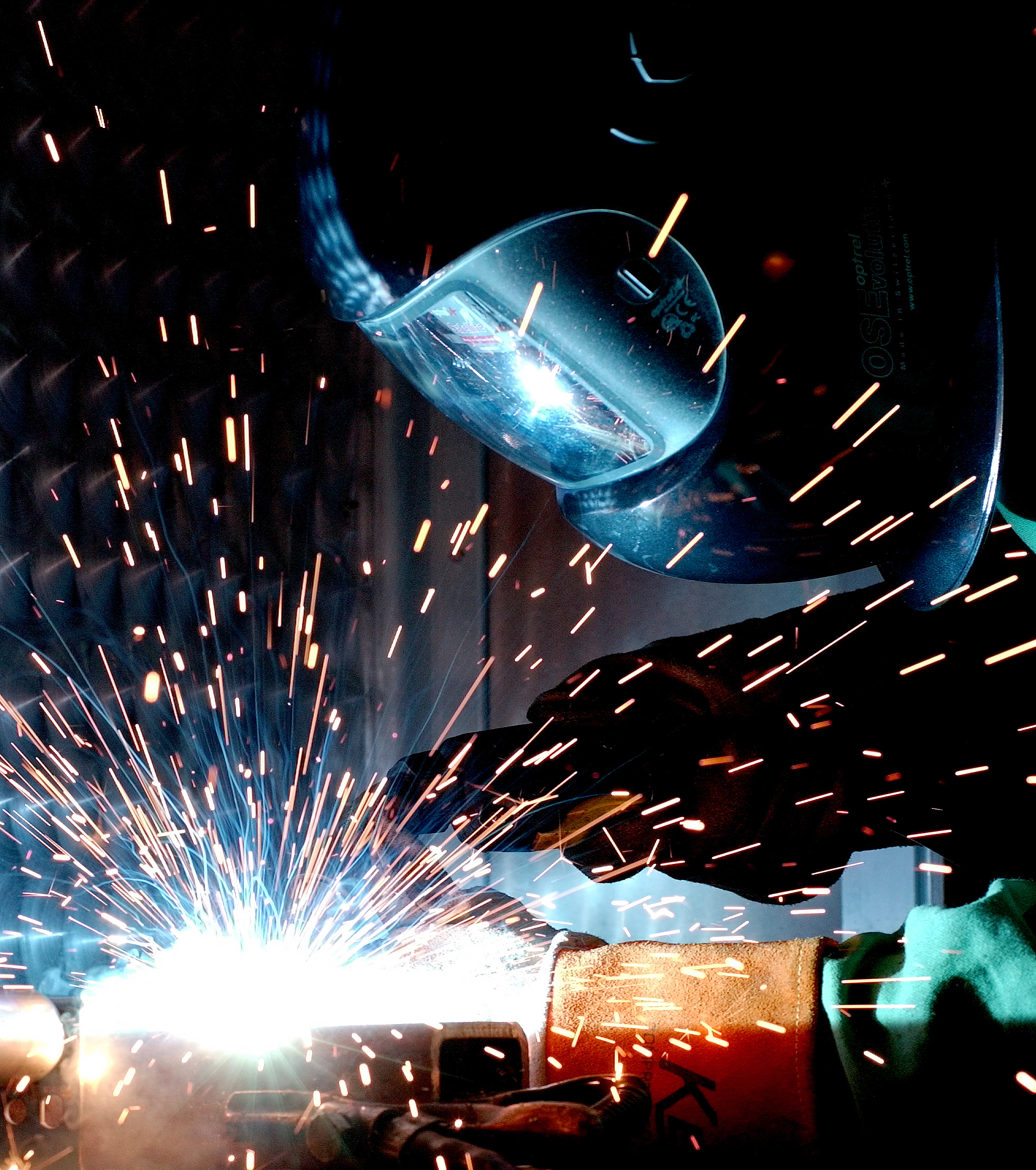
Gas Metal Arc Welding

The process of joining two pieces of metal or plastic together through an electrode. Several forms of welding exist, including:

- Shielded Metal Arc Welding (SMAW) or Stick Welding
- Gas Metal Arc Welding (GMAW) or Magnesium Inert Gas Welding (MIG)
- Flux-Cored Arc Welding (FCAW)
- Gas Tungsten Arc Welding (GTAW) or Tungsten Inert Gas Welding (TIG)
- Submerged Arc Welding (SAW)

Welding temperatures vary depending on the type of electrode, but is typically higher than soldering.

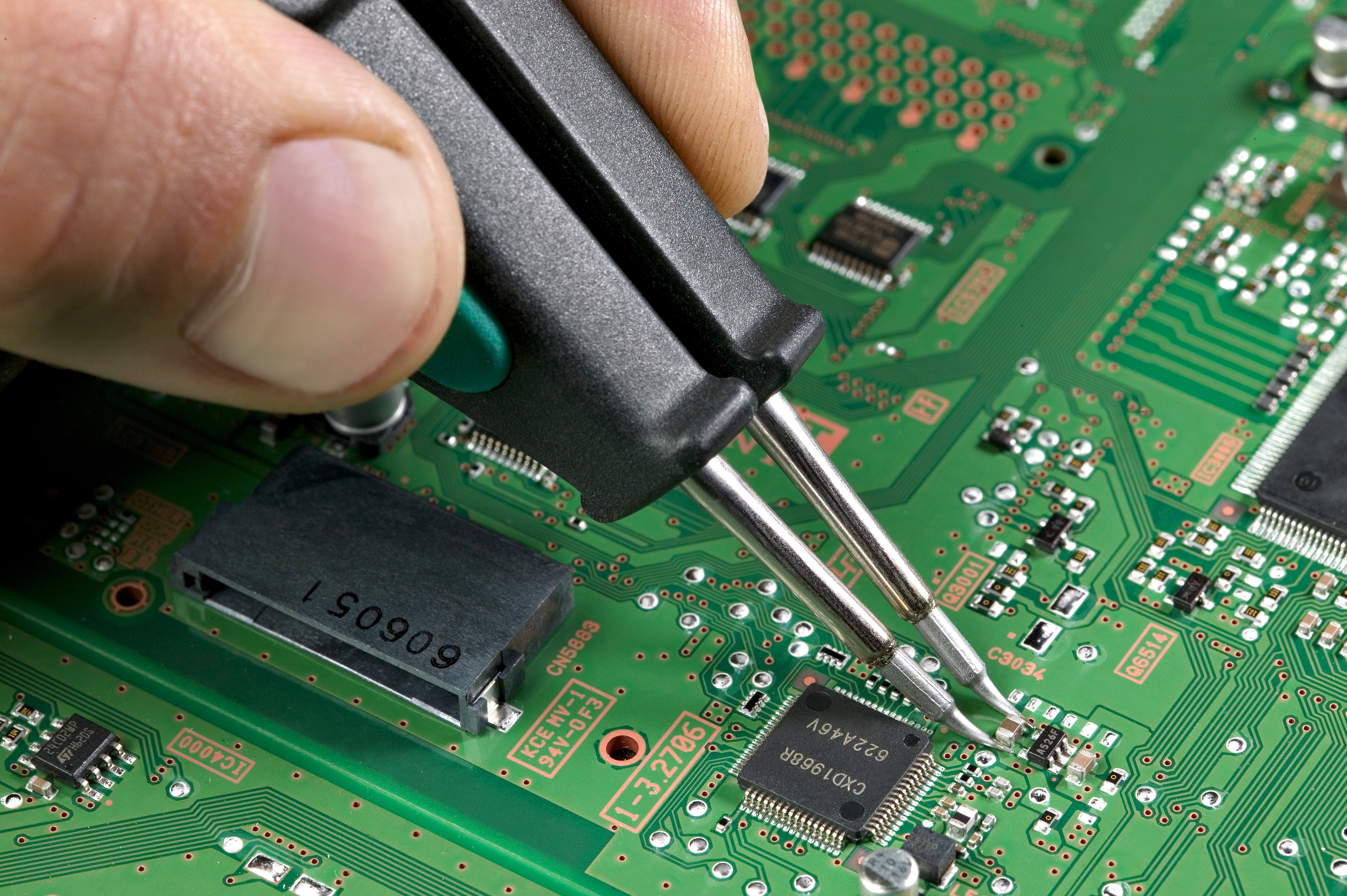
De-soldering of a 1210 capacitor using no flux.

=== Soldering ===
Soldering is the same type of joining process as welding but uses different filler material called solder and operates at under 450 degrees Celsius (841 degrees Fahrenheit). Soldering is commonly used in circuit boards and copper pipes in plumbing.

=== Brazing ===
Brazing is used in applications to join close fitting members in the range of 0.001 to 0.005 inches. Brazing operations are conducted at temperatures above 450 degrees Celsius.

=== Cutting ===
Cutting processes that produce sparks fall under the category of hot work. Examples include sparks produced from saw cutting and grinding.

== Safety ==
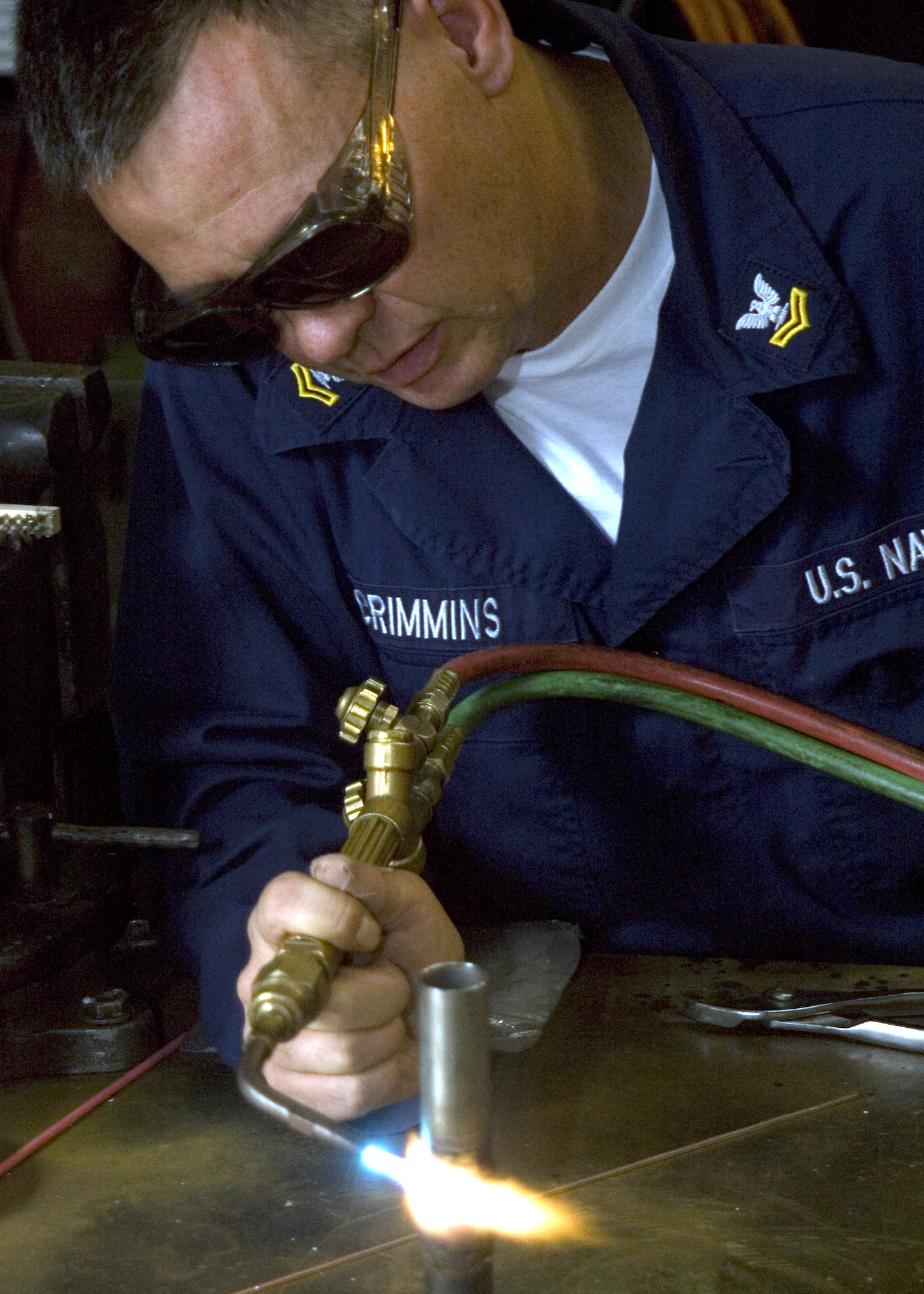
Aviation mechanic practicing brazing techniques

The safety concerns associated with hot work activities can vary significantly depending on the specific processes involved and the environmental conditions of the workplace. While each hot work job is unique in some way, they generally share common fire-related hazards. To address these risks, general safe work practices can be implemented:

- Hazard assessment: Identify fire, explosion, and environmental risks in the work area.
- Hot work permitting: Complete the hot work permitting process by ensuring that all inspection items are checked off and approved by an authorize official.
  - Special considerations and additional safety measures should be made if hot work is required in a confined space.
- Area preparation: Ensure the space is ready to hot work by removing or protect combustibles materials, adequate ventilation is present, and inspection of equipment.
- Fire watch: Designate an individual(s) to be present during the work and after to monitor for fires or other hazards.

While hot work is inherently hazardous, using the methods listed above along with the hierarchy of controls is widely recognized as a best practice for maintaining safety during these types of activities.

While the hazards associated with performing hot work will never be eliminated, there are safety procedures that must be adhered to prior to commence any type of hot work activity. Federal Organizations such as Occupational Safety and Health Administration (OSHA) and the National Fire Protection Agency (NFPA) provide safety guidelines that involve risk assessments, permitting systems along with minimum training requirements. These guidelines can help reduce the overall risks of workplace fires and prevent injury to personnel. Proper safety and managements practices start with a hazard assessment of the work area prior to conducting any hot work.

== Fire watch ==
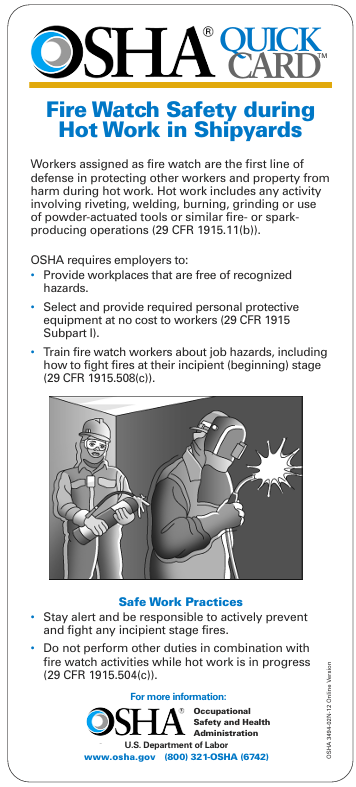
OSHA Fact Sheet for Fire Watch Safety during Hot Work in Shipyards

Fire watch is a short-term safety work practice that involves one or more individuals continuously monitoring a building, or a specific area within it, to detect and address fire hazards during hot work operations or during periods of life safety system impairments.

During hot work activities, a fire watch is intended to ensure that hot work byproducts (sparks, slag, metal, etc.) do not affect the surrounding workplace or spread to other areas. Fire watch duties must be carried out by at least two individuals. In the United States, the OSHA specifies that the person performing the hot work cannot also serve as the fire watch.

Fire watch duties include:

- Have access to least one fire extinguisher and being trained in its proper use. In occupied buildings, this extinguisher should not be removed from its designated location or surrounding areas. This extinguisher should specially be for hot work activities.
  - The fire extinguisher should be rated at a minimum of 2-A:20-B:C and located within 30 feet of the hot work activities.
  - Fire extinguisher operation: P.A.S.S - Pull the pin, Aim the nozzle as base of fire, Squeeze handle firmly, Sweep the area affected area.
- Patrol the immediate and surrounding area for signs of fire or any other possible hazard.
- Sound the alarm in the event there is a fire or emergency. Fire watch personnel should have an effective way to communicate with other individuals in the work place and a reliable way to get in touch with emergency services.
- Maintain the fire watch for the entire duration of hot work activates and for at least 30 minutes after the completion of all work.
  - Depending on the authority having jurisdiction, the duration of the fire watch may be extended based on the specific hazards associated with the hot work or the surrounding environment.

== Hot work permit ==
The hot work permitting process is a safety procedure required by regulatory statutes that establishes a formal authorization before any hot work activities begin. This process serves as both a safeguard and a written declaration from the hot work operator, confirming that all necessary safety practices have been followed. It also acts as a reminder to ensure no critical steps are overlooked before starting the work.

There are several key steps included in the permit process. First, a proper risk assessment is to be completed within the workspace where hot work will take place to evaluate fire or explosion hazards. Next, the operator ensures other safety measures are in place such as a appropriate fire extinguisher or suppression system, adequate ventilation and the removal of combustible material. Personnel assigned to serve as fire watch while and after work is completed, who has gone through the proper level of training.

When referring to widely recognized regulatory guidance such as National Fire Protection Agency (NFPA) 51B: Standard for Fire Prevention During Welding, Cutting, and Other Hot Work and the International Fire Code (IFC) Chapter 35: Welding and Other Hot Work, this permitting process is required to be completed before any hot work can begin.

Steps in the hot work permitting process:

1. The hot work operator conducts a risk assessment of the intended work area.
2. The operator gathers all appropriate equipment and safety items.
3. A fire watch is designated to monitor the area during and after the work.
4. The operator completes the permit recording all information and confirming that all safety measures have been addressed.
5. The permit is submitted for approval to a supervisor or designated authorizing individual(s).
6. Once approved, the permit must be visibly posted at the hot work site for the entire duration of the work.
7. After all hot work is completed, the permit must be retained for at least three years to comply with regulatory requirements and to support audits or incident investigations.

Only after these standards have been met will the permit be approved by an authorized supervisor. The permit shall be displayed and visible within the workspace throughout the time hot work is being performed. After hot work is completed, the permit can be retained for recordkeeping and proof of compliance. These steps reinforce safety measures while reducing negligence and complacency while at the same time ensure accountability.

== Confined spaces ==
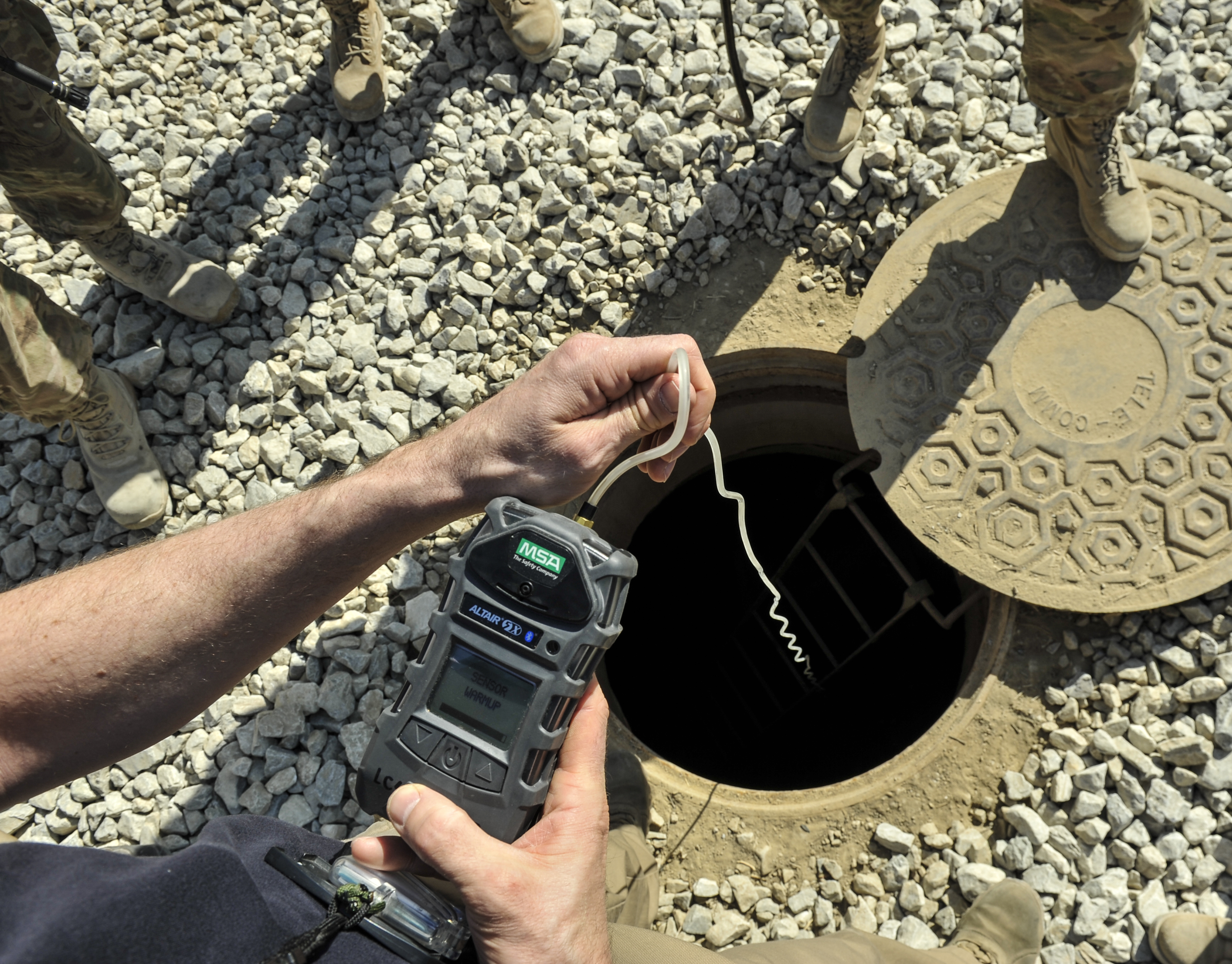
Air quality testing for hazardous atmospheres inside a manhole

Confined spaces are spaces not designed for human continuous occupancy due to limited or restricted points of exit and entry. These spaces include, but limited to tanks, storage containers, pits, vaults, hoppers, tunnels, manholes, ductwork, vessels, pipelines, silos etc. Hot work performed in these spaces present fire and explosion risk due to the presence of flammable gasses and other hazardous elements in their atmosphere. The following present physical and chemical hazards in confined spaces are:

- Limited access points make entering and exiting difficult
- Poor ventilation and limited airflow can lead to the buildup of toxic and flammable gasses
- Gasses such as Carbon Monoxide can build up from hot work in confined spaces
- Workers can face entrapment when physical barriers or equipment fails

In the United States, OSHA requires confined spaces where hot work is done to acquire a permit for hot work. General requirements for hot work include:

- The employer shall post danger signs or other effective means of the existence, location, and danger posed by permit spaces
- The employer must have a written permit confined space program available for inspection by employees

There are several specific circumstances in which an employer may qualify for exemptions from parts of the regulation, such as when the hazard present is solely a hazardous atmosphere and forced ventilation is utilized.

== International standards and adoption of hot work safety practices ==
Most countries in the world use their own rules and regulations that have different responsibilities for both the employer and employee regarding safety and risk mitigation in the workplace, while some countries lack these rules or struggle to enforce them. The International Fire Code Chapter 35 presents a general framework for countries to adopt and utilize in the building of their own safety regulations regarding hot work.

=== Agencies, governments, and/or safety organizations that have adopted some version of hot work safety practices ===
- United States – Occupational Safety and Health Administration: OSHA 1910 Subpart Q (General Industry), 1915 Subpart D (Shipyard), 1917 Subpart G (Marie Terminals), 1926 Subpart J (Construction)
- Europe – Confederation of Fire Protection Associations Europe: CFPA-E Guideline No 12:2023 F (Fire Safety Basics for Hot Work Operatives)
- United Kingdom – The Regulatory Reform (Fire Safety) Order 2005: Part 2 Fire Safety Duties
- Singapore – Workplace Safety and Health (Shipbuilding and Ship-Repairing) Regulations: Part V Hot Work Permit System
- Russia – Order No. 1479 Rules of fire prevention regime in the Russian Federation
- World Wide / International – National Fire Protection Agency: Standard for Fire Prevention During Welding, Cutting, and Other Hot Work, International Fire Code: Chapter 35 - Welding & Other Hot Work, NIST: Fire Prevention During Welding, Cutting, and Other Hot Work

== See also ==
- Oil Industry Safety Directorate
