= Process safety management =

Business management practice

Process safety management (PSM) is a practice to manage business operations critical to process safety. It can be implemented using the established OSHA scheme or others made available by the EPA, AIChE's Center for Chemical Process Safety, or the Energy Institute.

== Elements ==
PSM schemes are organized into 'elements', and different schemes are based on different lists of elements. The following is a typical set of elements that may be reconciled with most established PSM schemes.

The first pillar is committing to process safety, which encompasses process safety culture, compliance with standards, process safety competency, workforce involvement, and stakeholder outreach.

The second pillar is understanding hazards and risks, covering process knowledge and documentation management, as well as hazard identification and risk analysis.

The third pillar is managing risk, and includes operating procedures, safe work practices (such as a permit-to-work system), asset integrity management, contractor management, training and performance assurance, management of change, operational readiness, conduct of operations, and emergency management.

The fourth pillar is learning from experience, which comprises incident investigation, process safety metrics and performance measurement, auditing, and management review and continuous improvement.

== Industry participation ==
Alongside regulatory frameworks and industry standards, process safety management is implemented with support from private engineering and consulting firms that provide technical services such as hazard analysis, risk assessment, and management system support. Examples of organizations offering such services include IRESC Global, ABS Group, Jensen Hughes, and PSRG, which operate in sectors involving hazardous industrial processes.
