= Contractor management =

Contractor management is the managing of outsourced work performed for an individual company. Contractor management implements a system that manages contractors' health and safety information, insurance information, training programs and specific documents that pertain to the contractor and the owner client. Most modern contracts require the effective use of contract management software to aid administration between multiple parties.

== Risk and control ==
Risk increases with the loss of control from outsourcing work. Keeping work in-house gives an Owner Client complete control over the production or services provided including quality, durability, and consistency. Outsourcing the work reduces the amount of control held over these aspects. While contracts and agreements can be set in place to control the end product, the Owner Client cannot have complete assurance that their requirements are being met.

With the continuing outsourcing of production, companies struggle to standardize their contractor management processes. Requirements and regulations from the U.S. Occupational Safety and Health Administration and other governing bodies are constantly changing. Companies need to have full visibility into the quality of work their hired contractors have performed in the past and are performing now, and this often proves difficult.

There are tools that may measure the contractor's level of performance. For example, many large refineries have integrated their gate access control system to contract management software. This provides real-time access to the performance of the contractor workforce within the refinery.

== Components ==
Effective contractor management relies first on a standardized prequalification form (PQF). A quality prequalification form will also allow for customized functionality, as needed. The prequalification form ensures that the necessary steps are in place for a contractor to work safely and sustainably, prior to establishing an agreement, or allowing a vendor to come on-site.

A pre-qualification form (or an explanation of the requirements) is provided before bidding or quoting to assure and include the requirements in work plans and budgets.

Specifically, the prequalification form will allow the organization to track the most important aspect of contractor management – contractor prequalification across these essential dynamics:

- Financial stability
- Regulatory citation history
- Safety and Health statistics and programs
- Environmental protection programs
- Background checks and Security programs
- Sustainability/ Social Responsibility background and programs, including Human Rights.
- Site-specific requirements (as needed)
- Major projects performed, including references
- The length of time the contractor has been in business
- Services performed, and a risk ranking based on the contractor's trade
- Insurance coverage and limits, additional insured, and waiver of subrogation

A thorough prequalification form with each of these components is used to verify incidence rates and ensures that the contractor's insurance certification is in line with company requirements.

The prequalification form is then reviewed for OSHA logs and Experience Modification Ratings (EMR) to unearth any inconsistencies and to verify the contractor license status. Finally, references are contacted to provide actual work history and experience to further certify that the contractor is prequalified for performing work at that location.

== Auditing ==
Once the prequalification form has been filled out, the contractor must be monitored for compliance, this is a significant part of contractor management. An audit is conducted based on the services that are performed by the contractor and the risk associated with that service.

For contractors involved in a higher risk trade (e.g. electricians, lockout-tagout and confined space workers) the audit is an essential part of reviewing the contractor's safety program. Many of these high risk workers are involved in potentially life-threatening situations and must demonstrate their ability to protect employees and their clients from harmful situations.

In order to determine that the contractor possesses an adequate understanding of both the work to be performed and the safety standards that must be followed, the following questions are asked:

1. Is the Safety Program that is currently in place adequate?
2. Has the written program Safety Program been implemented?
3. Is the inspection of critical pieces of equipment being done?
4. Does the program allow for customization in the program based on risk?
5. Is the Safety Program specific to the contractor and the services provided?
6. Are the essential programs addressed, based on the services that will be performed?
7. Is there a method to ensure the training based on written programs is being conducted?
8. Are Job Hazard Analyses (JHAs), job-site inspections and other hazard identification / mitigation techniques being used and documented?

These questions are then used as indicators to determine the contractor's level of performance. The audit ensures that the contractor has prepared for, and is enforcing, safety guidelines in their everyday practices. Essentially, the audit provides a third-party confirmation that the information supplied in the prequalification form is both accurate and up-to-date.

== Database ==
A database can be used to record and access vendor data within a contractor management program. The database needs to be updated regularly, to ensure that all stakeholders are kept informed of any changes, particularly if the contractor management program is being used to eliminate subpar performers. The use of an online contractor management database facilitates the sharing of contractor data in a secure format with all necessary users, using 24-7/365 availability.

== Benefits ==
The purpose of a contractor management program is to better centralize, qualify and monitor a contingent workforce. As a result of implementing a contractor management program, an organization can expect to experience some, or all, of the following advantages:

1. Cost savings
2. Better supplier/client relationships
3. Higher quality contractors and suppliers
4. Less paperwork for both owners and contractors. Some contractor management programs are cloud based software platforms that allow contractors to manage their own permits, licenses, inductions, training records and other issues that facilitate organisational and regulatory compliance.
5. Instant information sharing & evergreen qualification
6. Reduced risk – continuous improvement in loss control
7. Moving towards using leading indicators vs. lagging indicators
8. Contractor awareness with regulatory and best practices such as VPP and PSM

These advantages are both immediate and long-standing. A comprehensive web-based contractor management program from a reputable firm can provide a reliable basis for prequalifying contractors, vendors and other suppliers of goods and services.

== Mitigating risk ==
There are two major considerations when managing contractors. First is deciding on the criteria for evaluation and second is developing an effective management process to evaluate these criteria. There are a number of criteria on which a contractor's safety can be evaluated, such as historical and future trend information.

== See also ==
- Contingent labor
- Contingent workforce
- Vendor management system
