= Structured what-if technique =

Method of prospective hazards analysis

The structured what-if technique (SWIFT) is a prospective hazards analysis method that uses structured brainstorming with guidewords and prompts to identify risks, with the aim of being quicker than more intensive methods like failure mode and effects analysis (FMEA). It is used in various settings, including healthcare.

As with other methods, SWIFT may not be comprehensive and the approach has some limitations. In a healthcare context, SWIFT was found to reveal significant risks, but like similar methods (including healthcare failure mode and effects analysis) it may have limited validity when used in isolation.
