= Asset integrity management systems =

Efficiency tracking system

Asset Integrity Management Systems (AIMS) outline the ability of an asset to perform its required function effectively and efficiently whilst protecting health, safety and the environment and the means of ensuring that the people, systems, processes, and resources that deliver integrity are in place, in use and will perform when required over the whole life-cycle of the asset. Originally developed in the UK, Asset Integrity Management was the result of a collaboration between the HSE and leading oil and gas operators resulting in a series of reports (Belfry Report) and workshops, the outcome being a group of documents called Key Programmes (KP Series), currently publicly available.

An Integrity Management System should address the quality at every stage of the asset life cycle, from the design of new facilities to maintenance management to decommissioning. Inspections, auditing/assurance and overall quality processes are just some of the tools designed to make an integrity management system effective.

Under the operational phase of the life cycle, the asset integrity, for example in the oil and gas industry can be divided into disciplines based on equipment categories:

1. Static equipment integrity
2. Rotating equipment/machinery integrity
3. Electrical equipment integrity
4. Instrument and control equipment integrity
5. Structural integrity
6. Pipeline integrity
7. Well integrity
8. Evacuation and rescue system integrity

The AIMS should also endeavour to maintain the asset in a fit-for-service condition while extending its remaining life in the most reliable, safe, and cost-effective manner. The AIM programs (in the US) attempt to meet API-580, API-581, and PAS 55 requirements, as applicable. (However local legal requirements may differ, please refer to a competent, experienced local professional for advice).

The AIMS document will stipulate the requirements for subsequent Integrity Management Plans.

Asset Integrity management improves plant reliability and safety whilst reducing unplanned maintenance and repair costs.

But an asset integrity management system does not exist in isolation. In order to successfully implement an asset integrity management system in a dynamic operating environment, it is essential that all stakeholders have a consistent and a unified understanding of what the essentials of asset integrity are and how they can be applied in their day-to-day operations, yet this is often cited as among the most significant challenges in achieving an integrity culture within an organisation.
