= Process manufacturing =

Branch of manufacturing that is associated with formulas and manufacturing recipes

Process manufacturing is a branch of manufacturing that is associated with formulas and manufacturing recipes, and can be contrasted with discrete manufacturing, which is concerned with discrete units, bills of materials and the assembly of components. Process manufacturing is also referred to as a 'process industry' which is defined as an industry, such as the chemical or petrochemical industry, that is concerned with the processing of bulk resources into other products.

Process manufacturing is common in the food, beverage, chemical, pharmaceutical, nutraceutical, consumer packaged goods, cannabis, and biotechnology industries. In process manufacturing, the relevant factors are ingredients, not parts; formulas, not bills of materials; and bulk materials rather than individual units. Although there is invariably cross-over between the two branches of manufacturing, the major contents of the finished product and the majority of the resource intensity of the production process generally allow manufacturing systems to be classified as one or the other. For example, a bottle of juice is a discrete item, but juice is process manufactured. The plastic used in injection moulding is process manufactured, but the components it is shaped into are generally discrete, and subject to further assembly.

== Examples of process industries ==
- Bulk-drug pharmaceuticals
- Chemical, tire, and process industries (CTP)
- Cosmeceuticals and personal care
- Food and beverage, Food processing
- Nutraceuticals
- Paints and coatings
- Semiconductor fabrication
- Specialty chemicals
- Steel and aluminium processing
- Textiles

== Formulation ==
Formulation is a simple concept, but it is often incorrectly equated with a bill of materials. Formulation specifies the ingredients and the amounts (e.g., pounds, gallons, liters) needed to make the product. The first thing to recognize is that to be able to work with a formula, the units of measure must correspond; a flexible unit of measure conversion engine running under an ERP software cover is needed. Furthermore, conversion rules must be specified to account for the unique requirements of the business in question. This formulation then needs to be scaled up to the development and then manufacturing scales, and must often be transferred and validated in different manufacturing sites around the world.

The proportions of ingredients in a formula also highlight the need for another feature, namely scalability. A formula to make 500 liters of a chemical must be scalable to make 250 liters or 1,000 liters. Another aspect of scalability is that it makes possible manufacturing based on how much of an ingredient is available. An example will illustrate this point. If you are making a car and only have two of the required four tires, you cannot make half a car. In other words, you must have all the parts in the required quantities to make the finished product; they are not scalable. But in process manufacturing, if you want to make 1,000 gallons of soda and you only have 500 gallons of the required 1,000 gallons of carbonated water, you have the option of making half as much soda. In process manufacturing you can make as much of a finished product as is specified in the formula for the smallest quantity in stock of one of the ingredients.

== Packaging ==
A packaging recipe is similar to a formula, but rather than describing the proportion of ingredients, it specifies how the finished product gets to its final assembly. A packaging recipe addresses such things as containers, labels, corrugated cartons, and shrink-wrapping. In process manufacturing, the finished product is usually produced in bulk, but is rarely delivered in bulk form to the customer. For example, the beverage manufacturer makes soda in batches of thousands of gallons. However, a consumer purchases soda in 12-ounce aluminum cans, or in 16-ounce plastic bottles, or in 1-liter bottles. And a restaurateur may have the option of getting a 5- or 50-gallon metal container with the beverage in syrup form, so that carbonated water can be added later.

Why is this concept important? Compare how often Coca-Cola changes the formula for Coke with how often the packaging is changed. If the formula and packaging recipes are linked, then every time the packaging changes, the formula would need modification. Likewise, when the formula is changed, all of the packaging recipes would have to be changed. This increases maintenance costs and chances for error. In process manufacturing, the formula for making the product and the recipe for packaging the product exist in separate structures to reduce the ongoing maintenance function. There is a difference between discrete manufacturing and process manufacturing in terms of flow patterns. An example given is that discrete manufacturing follows an "A" type process and process manufacturing follows a “V” type process.

In the production cycle, a work order or process order is issued to make the product in bulk. Separate pack orders are issued to signify how the bulk material is to be containerized and shipped to the customer. This is important in process industries that make “brite” stock or private labels. For example, large grocery chains sell products, such as soups, soda, and meats, under their own brand names, hence "private labels". But these chains do not have their own manufacturing plants; they contract for these products. In the case of soups, process manufacturers create and warehouse nondescript, unlabeled (hence “brite”) aluminum cans of soup. (Since the cans are filled, sealed, and then cooked under pressure, their shelf life is long.)

By separating the product formula from a packaging recipe, a production or process order can be issued to make and store the cans of soup and later, when the customer is ready to order soup, a work order can be issued to label the cans according to customer specifications before they are shipped to the store. Thus segregation of the formula and pack recipe makes the world of process manufacturing efficient and effective.

== Process manufacturing systems and methodologies ==
Enterprise resource planning

Just like the products that they produce, discrete manufacturing and process manufacturing use different Enterprise resource planning (ERP) systems which have different focal points and solve different problems. For the same reason that the proverbial square peg does not fit in the round hole, ERP software geared toward discrete manufacturing, or even hybrid manufacturing will not work smoothly in a process manufacturing setting. With process manufacturing, the end-product is unable to be broken down to its original ingredients, for example beer or pasta sauce. Thus, the ERP software must be able to account for these intricacies in its ability to convert and transform raw materials to finished goods. Critical aspects such as recipe formulation, forward and backward lot traceability, handling of mixed units of measure and conversion, raw material calculations, and scalable batch tickets with revision tracking and recording of manufacturing steps and production notes are specific to process manufacturers and key functionality of process manufacturing ERP systems. An example is the SAP module, Production Planning - Process Industries (PP-PI).

In Process Inspections and Statistical Process Control

In process inspection for process manufacturing refers to inspection at any point in producing a product, and is also referred to as in process product verification. The objective of in process inspection is to ensure the requirements of the product are being met before they are finalized and continue to the next stage. Identifying a problem at an early stage in the production process allows for correction and preventative action to avoid wasted time and resources at the end of a production run.

Statistical Process Control complements process manufacturing and in process inspections to ensure that the process operates efficiently, producing more specification-conforming products with less waste (rework or scrap).

Process approach in Management Systems

The process approach is one of seven quality management principles that ISO management system standards are based on, and includes establishing the organization’s processes to operate as an integrated and complete system.

In Food processing, complying product has to come from a process to comply, in comparison to discrete manufacturing where a finished product is inspected to comply. An example how the process approach complements a process industry is implementation of ISO 22000 as a Food Safety Management System (FSMS). The process approach involves the systematic definition and management of processes, and their interactions, so as to achieve the intended results in accordance with the food safety policy and strategic direction of the organization. Management of the processes and the system as a whole can be achieved using the PDCA cycle, with an overall focus on risk-based thinking aimed at taking advantage of opportunities and preventing undesirable results.

== See also ==
- Manufacturing
- Urban manufacturing
