= Seveso Directive =

Seveso Directive may refer to:

- Directive 82/501/EC, Seveso Directive I (1982)
- Directive 96/82/EC, Seveso Directive II (1996)
- Directive 2012/18/EU, Seveso Directive III (2012)

== See also ==
- Seveso disaster
