= Inherent safety =

Situation with a low worst-case danger level

In the chemical and process industries, a process has inherent safety if it has a low level of danger even if things go wrong. Inherent safety contrasts with other processes where a high degree of hazard is controlled by protective systems. As perfect safety cannot be achieved, common practice is to talk about inherently safer design. “An inherently safer design is one that avoids hazards instead of controlling them, particularly by reducing the amount of hazardous material and the number of hazardous operations in the plant.”

== Origins ==
The concept of reducing rather than controlling hazards stems from British chemical engineer Trevor Kletz in 1978 paper "What You Don’t Have, Can’t Leak" on lessons from the Flixborough disaster, and the expression "inherent safety" from a book that was an expanded version of the article. A greatly revised and retitled 1991 version mentioned the techniques which are generally quoted. (Kletz originally used the term intrinsically safe in 1978, but as this had already been used for the special case of electronic equipment in potentially flammable atmospheres, only the term inherent was adopted. Intrinsic safety may be considered a special subset of inherent safety). In 2010 the American Institute of Chemical Engineers published its own definition of inherently safer technology (IST).

== Principles ==
The terminology of inherent safety has developed since 1991, with some slightly different words but the same intentions as Kletz. The four main methods for achieving inherently safer design are:

- Minimize: Reducing the amount of hazardous material present at any one time, e.g. by using smaller batches.
- Substitute: Replacing one material with another of less hazard, e.g. cleaning with water and detergent rather than a flammable solvent
- Moderate: Reducing the strength of an effect, e.g. having a cold liquid instead of a gas at high pressure, or using material in a dilute rather than concentrated form
- Simplify: Eliminating problems by design rather than adding additional equipment or features to deal with them. Only fitting options and using complex procedures if they are really necessary.

Two further principles are used by some:

- Error tolerance: Equipment and processes can be designed to be capable of withstanding possible faults or deviations from design. A very simple example is making piping and joints capable of withstanding the maximum possible pressure, if outlets are closed.
- Limit effects by design, location or transportation of equipment so that the worst possible condition produces less danger, e.g. gravity will take a leak to a safe place, the use of bunds.

In terms of making plants more user-friendly Kletz added the following:

- Avoiding knock-on effects;
- Making incorrect assembly impossible;
- Making status clear;
- Ease of control;
- Software and management procedures.

The opportunity to adopt an inherently safer design is ideal at the research and conceptual design stages; such opportunity decreases and the project cost increases if changes are made during the subsequent design stages. Once a conceptual design is completed, the other safety strategies should be applied along with the inherently safer design concept. However, in this case, the project cost would significantly increase to have the same risk level at the same reliability relative to if ISD (inherently safer design) was adopted during the conceptual design stage.

== Official status ==
Inherent safety has been recognised as a desirable principle by a number of national authorities, including the US Nuclear Regulatory Commission and the UK Health and Safety Executive (HSE). In assessing COMAH (Control of Major Accident Hazards Regulations) sites the HSE states “Major accident hazards should be avoided or reduced at source through the application of principles of inherent safety”. The European Commission in its Guidance Document on the Seveso II Directive states “Hazards should be possibly avoided or reduced at source through the application of inherently safe practices.” In California, Contra Costa County requires chemical plants and petroleum refineries to implement inherent safety reviews and make changes based on these reviews. After a 2008 methyl isocyanate explosion at the Bayer CropScience chemical production plant in Institute, West Virginia, the US Chemical Safety Board commissioned a study by the National Academy of Sciences (NAS) how the concept of “Inherent Safety” could be applied, published in a report and video in 2012.

After the Bhopal disaster in 1984, the US state of New Jersey adopted the Toxic Catastrophe Prevention Act (TCPA) from 1985. In 2003 its rules were revised to include inherently safer technologies (IST). In 2005, the New Jersey Domestic Security Preparedness Task Force established a new “Best Practices Standards” program, in which it required chemical facilities to conduct inherently safer technologies (IST) reviews. In 2008, the TCPA program was expanded to require all TCPA facilities to conduct IST reviews on both new and existing processes. The State of New Jersey created its own definition of IST for regulatory purposes and stretched the definition of IST to include passive, active, and procedural controls.

Under Executive Order 13650 the U.S. Environmental Protection Agency (EPA) has been considering a proposal to “nationalize” the New Jersey inherently safer technologies program, inviting comments until end of October 2014. The American Chemistry Council lists disadvantages.

== Quantification ==
The Dow Fire and Explosion Index is essentially a measure of inherent danger and is the most widely used quantification of inherent safety. A more specific index of inherently safe design has been proposed by Heikkilä, and variations of this have been published. However all of these are much more complex than the Dow F & E Index.

== See also ==
- Fail-safe
- Generation IV reactor
- Intrinsic safety
- Passive nuclear safety
- Prevention through design
