= 2021 Rockton fire =

Maintenance accident at Chemtool Incorporated in Rockton, Illinois

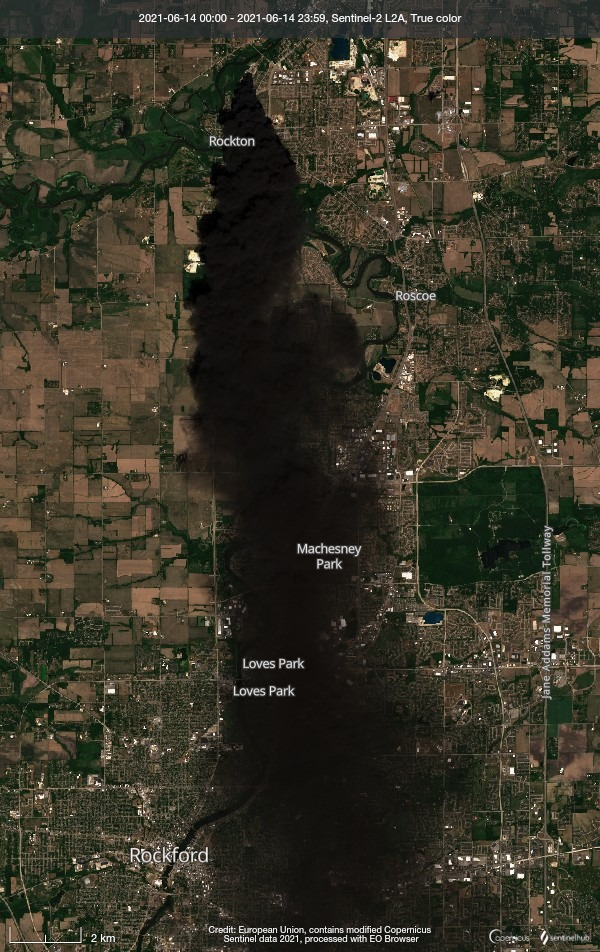
- True color satellite image of the smoke plume produced by the fire over sections of Illinois
- Date: June 14–18, 2021
- Time: ~7:00 CDT (~12:00 UTC)
- Duration: 4 days
- Location: Rockton, Illinois, United States; 42.46899°N 89.06698°W
- Cause: Maintenance accident and subsequent fire
- Injuries: 2

On June 14, 2021, a maintenance accident at the Chemtool Incorporated manufacturing plant in Rockton, Illinois, United States, triggered a chemical fire that lasted four days and injured two emergency workers. Portions of the village, located north of Rockford near the Illinois-Wisconsin state line, were subject to a mandatory evacuation as a result of the fire. The fire was not contained until June 16, with the evacuations lasting until June 18.

== Background ==
Rockton is a village in Winnebago County, Illinois. The village sits north of Rockford, close to the border with Wisconsin. According to the 2020 census, the population was 7,863, though a 2019 estimate put the number of residents at 7,441.

Chemtool Incorporated, a company that manufactures custom-formulated lubricants and grease products, claims to be the largest manufacturer of grease in the Americas. In the United States, Chemtool has four locations, three of which are in Illinois. It has a headquarters and a production center in Rockton; the latter was lost to the fire.

In 2011, Chemtool was acquired by Lubrizol, a provider of specialty chemicals and lubricants for various markets and industries. Lubrizol is itself a subsidiary of Berkshire Hathaway. In 2019, another Lubrizol-owned plant in Rouen, France, experienced a fire that caused smoke to spread across the northern part of the country. The fire reportedly caused nausea and headaches in residents near the fire, which spread smoke as far as Belgium and the Netherlands.

== Fire ==
The fire began shortly before 7:00 a.m. on June 14, 2021, when contractors were performing insulation replacement on an elevated heat transfer piping network at the Chemtool plant in Rockton. According to an investigation, the most likely explanation for the cause of the fire was that a scissor lift being used struck a valve, allowing mineral oils to spill out and cause a fire hazard. Efforts by operators to shut down the boiler, place containment booms, and de-pressure the piping failed to prevent the fire.

Sometime after 7:00 a.m., emergency crews were alerted to a fire at the plant. Explosions caused by the fire reportedly sounded like "fireworks". According to Rockton Fire Department Chief Kirk Wilson, 70 people were evacuated from the plant; however, a statement by Lubrizol said the number was closer to 50. A firefighter suffered a minor injury to his leg during the evacuation and initial efforts to stop the flames. Another firefighter had been hospitalized with breathing difficulties. Both were released from the hospital by June 16.

At 8:46 a.m., the Rockton Police Department ordered a mandatory evacuation for homes and businesses within a one-mile (1.6 km) radius of the plant. Later that day, Governor J. B. Pritzker expanded the radius to two miles (3.2 km), and encouraged residents near the fire to wear masks. Though there was no concern regarding air quality at the time, the evacuations were issued as a precautionary measure. An estimated 1,000 people were affected by the evacuation. The smoke plume from the fire was reportedly large enough to be seen on weather radar.

Authorities had raised concerns over whether contaminated runoff could have escaped into the nearby Rock River, a vital water source for the community. As a result, crews stopped the use of water to mitigate the fire to prevent runoff, which posed a risk of an "environmental nightmare". Crews managing the site reportedly dug trenches and placed booms to prevent any runoff from reaching the river.

On June 15, U.S. Fire Pumps, a private industrial firefighting crew based in Louisiana, were called to assist in managing the fire. The crew had experience in battling various refinery fires across the United States.

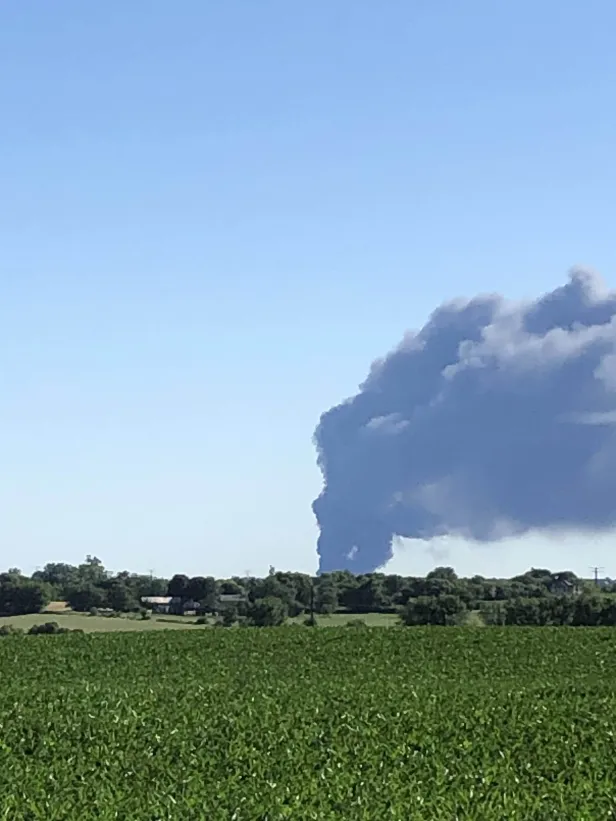
The Fire from Burritt Township, Illinois

By the morning of June 16, the fire had been contained, but was still burning. Despite this, the mandatory evacuation and mask recommendation were still in effect, as a result of concern over "pulmonary irritants" from particles in the air. A local public health administrator also advised residents not to handle any waste that had fallen from the sky, and to sequester such items for disposal. Officials also confirmed that no toxins were released into the water system or waterways in the region. The Illinois National Guard, alongside crews from the Illinois Environmental Protection Agency and the Illinois Emergency Management Agency, were deployed by Governor Pritzker. Salvation Army volunteers also set up a mobile unit to provide food for emergency responders attending to the fire. The Red Cross was also present.

On June 18, the fire was extinguished and mandatory evacuations were lifted. Authorities confirmed there was no air or water contamination after further testing.

== Aftermath ==
After the evacuations were lifted, some residents returned to homes that had been damaged by the fire. Concerns were raised over the toxicity of a foam used to extinguish the fire, which reportedly contained per- and polyfluoroalkyl substances able to contaminate groundwater. There was also concern over the usage of perfluorooctanoic and perfluorohexanoic acids to contain the fire. No contamination was detected.

On June 28, an investigation revealed that the cause of the fire was likely due to an accident during maintenance that allowed mineral oils to spill and pose a fire risk. However, the exact source of ignition remains under investigation.

== See also ==
- Rockton, Illinois
- Lubrizol factory fire in Rouen
