= Chemical Industries of Ethylene Oxide explosion =

Explosion in Tarragona, Spain

- Date: 14 January 2020
- Location: Tarragona, Catalonia, Spain
- Type: Explosion
- Deaths: 3
- Injuries: 7

On 14 January 2020, two explosions at the Chemical Industries of Ethylene Oxide (IQOXE) site in Tarragona, Catalonia, Spain, killed three offsite people and injured seven.

The site is operated by IQOXE, which is the only producer of ethylene oxide in Spain with an installed capacity of 140,000 tonnes per year, and 50% of this production is destined to the manufacture of glycol, one of the main raw materials for the production of PET polymers. Because of the toxic nature of the chemicals it produces, the site is covered by the Seveso-III directive.

== Sequence ==
The first explosion occurred between 18:40 and 19:00 and affected an ethylene oxide tank of the company. The second one affected a transformation station of the same company. The blast was noticed within a radius of several kilometres.

Following the explosion, there was a severe fire with a large smoke plume. Thirty teams of firefighters ensured that the propylene oxide left in the tank burned in a controlled manner.

Following the explosion and the fire, a 500-metre (547 yd) exclusion zone was imposed; railway lines and a highway were closed. As a temporary measure, people in the area (populations of La Canonja, Vilaseca and 3 neighbourhoods of Tarragona) were confined in their homes. They were advised to keep doors and windows closed until more information would be available about the eventual toxicity of the smoke of the fire.

Two workers of the plant were killed off-site, due to a collapsing roof. A third person, Sergio Millán, 59, was killed after being struck by a steel plate, which was most likely the lid of the reactor tank, that was catapulted over a distance of 2 km (1.2 mi) due to the blast of the explosion. A video taken by a security camera shows the plate flying through the air.

The weight of the reactor lid was 800 kg (1,764 lb). Seven employees were injured, two of them seriously due to major burns. The injured were treated in hospitals in Barcelona and Tarragona.

== Ethylene oxide ==
Ethylene oxide is a very hazardous substance. At room temperature it is a flammable, carcinogenic, mutagenic, irritating, and anaesthetic gas. It is used for making many consumer products as well as non-consumer chemicals and intermediates. These products include detergents, thickeners, solvents, plastics, and various organic chemicals.

== Site classification ==
The IQOXE site is classified as an "upper tier establishment" under Directive 2012/18/EU, meaning its operators should comply with the strictest safety regimen. It is listed in the Electronic Seveso Plant Information Retrieval System database. Article 20 states the period between two consecutive inspections at such sites shall not exceed one year.
