= Flixborough =

Village and civil parish in North Lincolnshire, England

Coordinates: 53.62430°N 0.68335°W

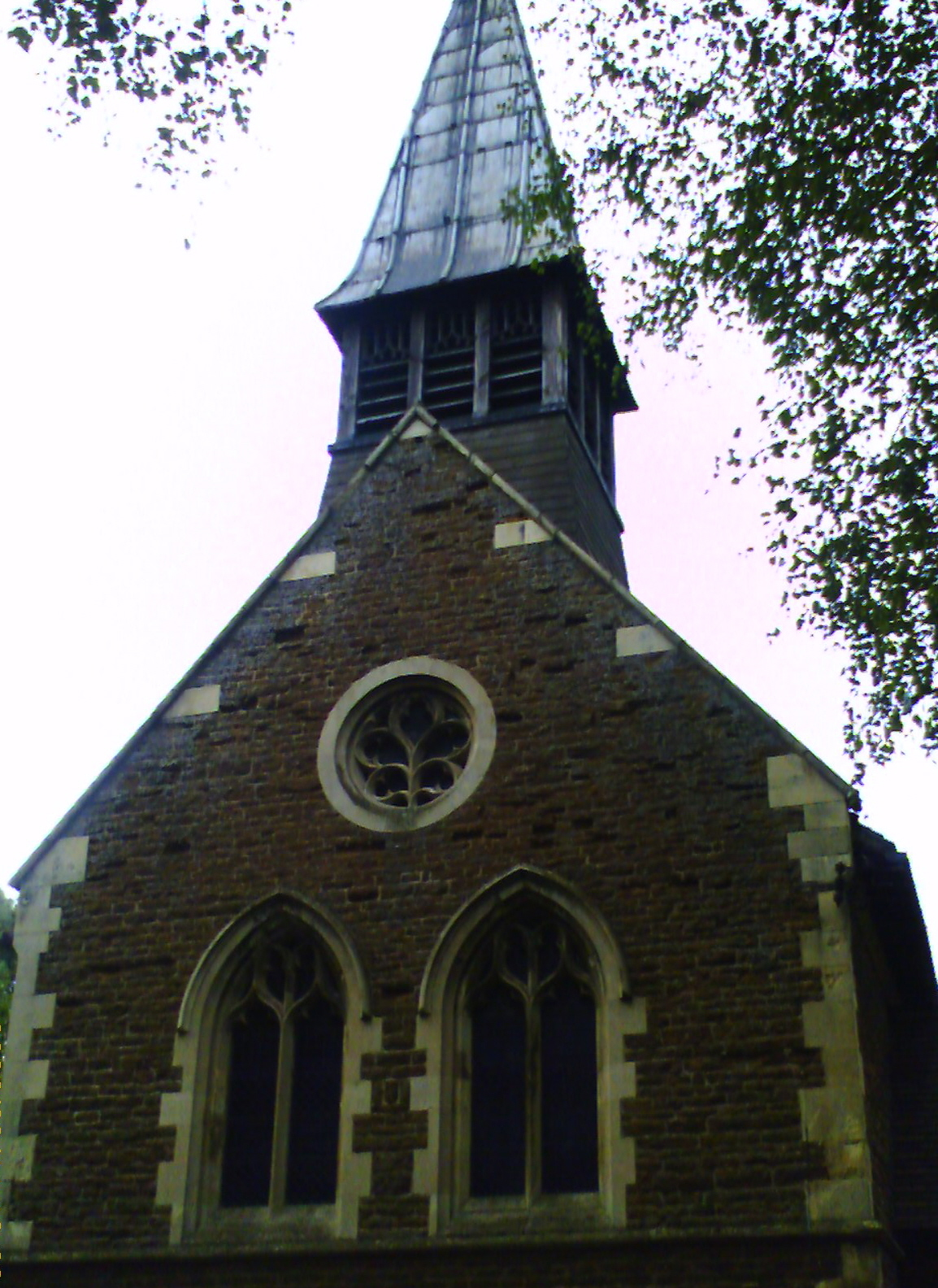
- Church of All Saints

- Location within Lincolnshire
- Population: 1,664 (2011)
- OS grid reference: SE871150
  - London: 145 mi (233 km) S
- Civil parish: Flixborough
- Unitary authority: North Lincolnshire
- Ceremonial county: Lincolnshire
- Region: Yorkshire and the Humber
- Country: England
- Sovereign state: United Kingdom
- Post town: SCUNTHORPE
- Postcode district: DN15
- Dialling code: 01724
- Police: Humberside
- Fire: Humberside
- Ambulance: East Midlands
- UK Parliament: Scunthorpe

Flixborough is a village and civil parish in North Lincolnshire, England. The population at the 2011 census was 1,664. It is near the River Trent, 3 miles (5 km) north-west from Scunthorpe. The village is noted for the 1974 Flixborough disaster.

Flixborough is in the Burton upon Stather and Winterton ward of North Lincolnshire Council, and its boundary covers the southern part of Normanby Park. Its Grade II listed Anglican church is dedicated to All Saints. The village public house is The Flixborough Inn on High Street.

== History ==
Flixborough has had many different spellings through the centuries, from "Flichesburg" in the Domesday Book of 1086 to Flikesburg, Flyxburgh and Flixburrow. Eminson suggests that the first part of the name is an early form of the word cliff, and as the original settlement stood on a sloping cliff overlooking the River Trent, the village's name can be translated as "fortified dwelling on the cliff slope".

The remains of an Anglo-Saxon settlement in the parish of Flixborough were excavated by Humberside Archaeology Unit between 1989 and 1991. The settlement was located 5 miles (8.0 km) to the south of the Humber Estuary, overlooking the floodplain of the Trent. During the two-year programme, an unprecedented Middle to Late Saxon rural settlement sequence was uncovered, dating between the early 7th and early 11th centuries AD. It is particularly exceptional because of the association of 40 buildings, floor surfaces and massive refuse dumps.

A notable son of Flixborough is Sir Edmund Anderson, who was Chief Justice of the Common Pleas during the reign of Queen Elizabeth I and tried Mary, Queen of Scots.

Flixborough is one of the Thankful Villages that suffered no fatalities during the First World War. The village was featured on Darren Hayman's album, Thankful Villages Volume 2.

=== Entry from the 1900 Kelly's Trade Directory ===
Flixborough is a parish and pleasant village, 3 1/2 miles (5.6 km) northwest from Frodingham station on the Penistone and Cleethorpes branch of the Great Central (late M. S. and L.) railway, 7 miles east from Crowle and 21 miles north from Gainsborough, in the North Lindsey division of the county, parts of Lindsey, north division of Manley wapentake, Winterton petty sessional division, Brigg union, Brigg County Court district, rural deanery of Manlake, archdeaconry of Stow and diocese of Lincoln. Here is a ferry over the River Trent to Amcotts, and the Gainsborough Hull steam packets call here on Tuesdays and Fridays. The old church of All Saints, a very plain edifice of stone, erected in the year 1789, was taken down and rebuilt in 1886, at a cost of £1,710; and is now an edifice in the Late Decorated style, consisting of chancel, nave, south porch and a western belfry of wood, with spire, containing one bell: the church retains a Norman font and a handsome carved oak chancel screen: there are 150 sittings. The register dates from the year 1573. The living is a rectory united with the vicarage of Burton-upon-Stather, joint net yearly value £429, including 163 acres of glebe and two houses, in the gift of Sir B. D. G. Sheffield Bart. and held since 1882 by the Rev. Francis Amcotts Jarvis M.A. of Trinity College, Cambridge, rural dean of Manlake and J.P. Lincs. who resides at Burton. A new rectory house was built in 1884 by the rector, and is occupied by the Rev. Peter Tivy Tomkins of St Aidan's, who is curate. About half a mile (800 m) from the village traces of an old church and the moat belonging to a mansion, formerly, it is believed, the seat of the Anderson family, are still visible: this place is supposed to have been the birthplace of Sir Edmund Anderson, Chief Justice of the Common Pleas, in the reign of Queen Elizabeth, who died 1 August 1605, and was interred in the church of Epworth, Bedfordshire, where there is a monument with effigies to himself and his wife. Here was formerly a Roman settlement. Sir Berkeley D. G. Sheffield bart of Normanby Park, is Lord of the Manor and principal landowner. The soil is loam, clay, sand and warp; subsoil, various. The chief crops are wheat, barley, turnips, potatoes and beans, and some land is pasture. The area of the township is 2,651 acres of land, 72 of tidal water and 17 of foreshore; rateable value, £2,417; the population in 1891 was 242. Parish Clerk, G. Gillatt. Post Office – Samuel Tate, sub-postmaster. Letters arrive through Doncaster 8.15 am and are dispatched 6 p.m. Postal orders are issued here, but not paid. The nearest money order and telegraph office is at Burton-upon-Stather, 3 miles distant. Parish School (mixed) built in 1877, for 80 children; average attendance, 34; Miss Mary E. Ives, mistress.

=== Flixborough explosion ===
On Saturday 1 June 1974 at 16:53 Flixborough was at the centre of the UK's worst industrial accident when the Nypro Works chemical plant was devastated by an explosion, known as the Flixborough disaster. The plant manufactured Caprolactam. Escaping cyclohexane formed a flammable vapour cloud and ignited. Twenty-eight people died and more than 100 were injured, with around 100 homes in the village itself being destroyed or badly damaged. There is a memorial to the disaster.

=== Population figures (1801–1991) ===
Year	Population
1801	173
1811	199
1821	216
1831	210
1841	211
1851	199
1861	214
1871	246
1881	229
1891	242
1901	196
1911	344
1921	310
1931	400
1941	N/A
1951	394
1961	449
1971	394
1981	606
1991	946

== See also ==
- Glanford Power Station

== Bibliography ==
- The Early Medieval Settlement Remains From Flixborough, Lincolnshire. The Occupation Sequence, c. AD 600–1000. Excavations at Flixborough. Vol. 1. Ed. by Christopher Loveluck and David Atkinson. Oxford, Oxbow, 2007.
- Life and Economy at Early Medieval Flixborough, c. AD 600–1000: The Artefact Evidence. Excavations at Flixborough, Volume 2. Ed. by D. H. Evans and Christopher Loveluck. Oxford, Oxbow, 2009.
- Farmers, Monks and Aristocrats: The Environmental Archaeology of an Anglo-Saxon Flixborough. Excavations at Flixborough. Vol. 3. Edited by James Barrett, Keith Dobney, Deborah Jacques and Cluny Johnstone. Oxford, Oxbow, 2007.
- Rural Settlement, Lifestyles and Social Change in the Late First Millennium AD. Anglo-Saxon Flixborough in its Wider Context. Excavations at Flixborough. Vol. 4. Edited by Christopher Loveluck. Oxford, Oxbow, 2007.
