= Lubrizol factory fire in Rouen =

2019 industrial accident in France

Coordinates: 49.4365°N 1.0586°E

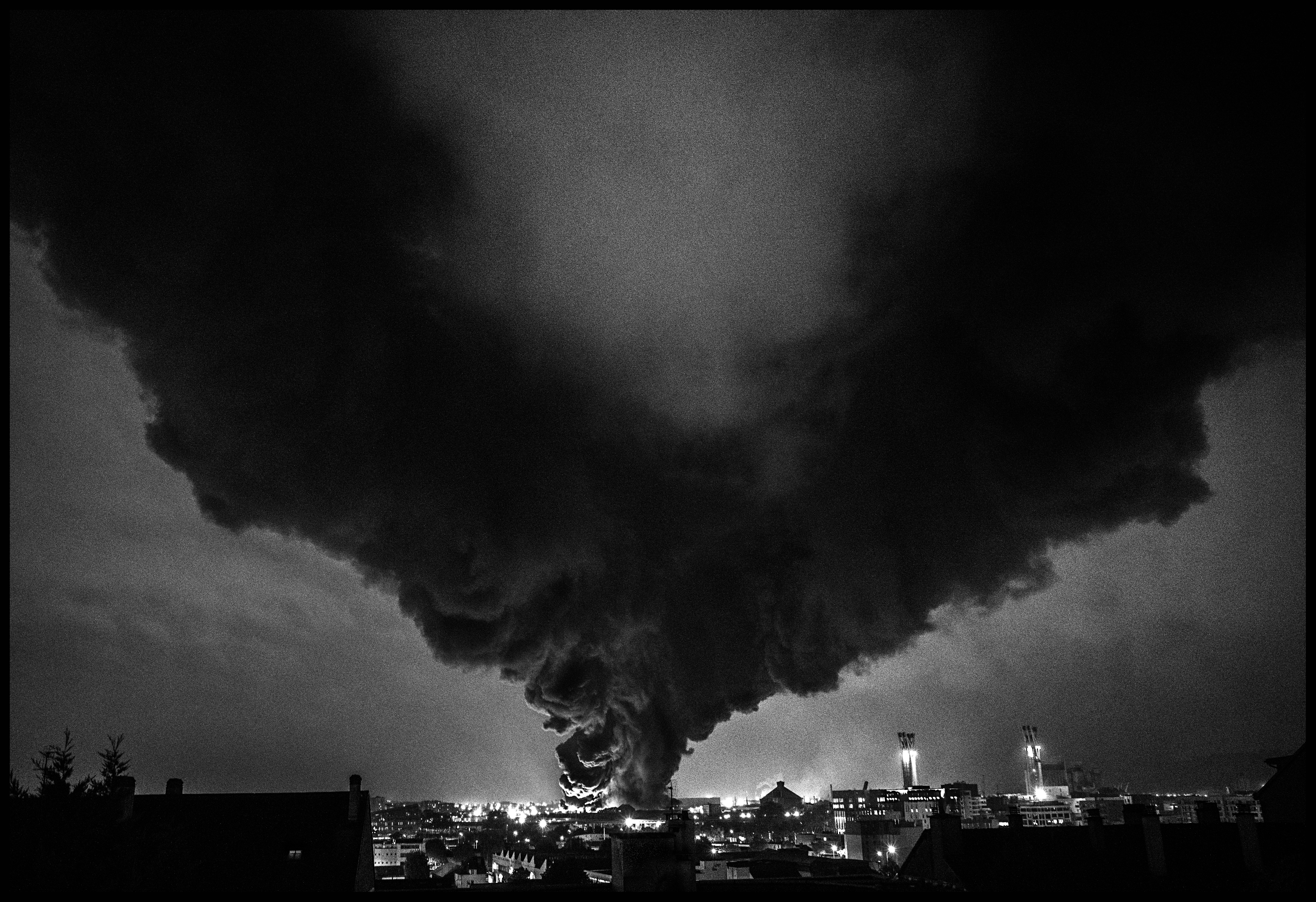
- The fire on the morning of 26 September
- Date: 26 September 2019
- Location: Quai de France, Rouen, Normandie, France
- Type: Structure fire
- Injuries: Numerous headaches and vomiting, 8 hospitalizations (patients already suffering from respiratory problems)

The Lubrizol factory fire occurred on 26 September 2019 in Rouen, France, when the Lubrizol chemical plant caught fire. The facility, subject to the Seveso-III Directive due to hazardous chemicals it stored and produced, created a large plume of smoke and led to a 500-metre (1,600 ft) exclusion zone. While there were no fatalities, the fire caused elevated pollution levels, prompting containment measures and agricultural suspensions. Economic impacts included business disruptions and destroyed harvests. A parliamentary inquiry and legal proceedings followed, and a government report was released in July 2020.

== Sequence of the disaster ==
On 26 September 2019, the Lubrizol chemical products plant and warehouses of Normandie Logistique in Rouen caught fire; the plant synthesizes and stores chemical products (phosphorus and organosulfur compounds) intended for use as lubricant additives. Because of the toxic nature of the chemicals it produces, the site is covered by the Seveso-III Directive.

For reasons yet unknown, the fire started in a still unknown location and affected part of the warehouses of Normandie Logistique and Lubrizol's storage area. A thick plume of black smoke formed, reaching more than 20 km (12 mi), and a 500 m (1,600 ft) exclusion zone was imposed. There were no fatalities and only non-fatal injuries. As part of the management of the accident, various measures were taken to protect the population (containment, school closures, suspension of certain agricultural activities, etc.).

In terms of human health, the results of the initial measurements (air, water) showed elevated levels of air pollution, without immediate direct risks, with the exception of benzene. Initial water quality measurements also revealed elevated levels without immediate toxic effects. However, following the publication of the list of products involved in the fire, questions remain as to whether or not hazardous products were present in the combustion by-products, which were not measured. The regional prefecture regularly published their analyses. In July 2020, a government report drawing lessons from the feedback was published.

The direct economic consequences resulted from companies partially ceasing their activity and farmers that had to destroy their harvests. A parliamentary fact-finding mission was launched, and legal proceedings were initiated.

== Lubrizol as a part of the Seveso Directive ==
The Seveso-III Directive (2012/18/EU) (full title: Directive 2012/18/EU of the European Parliament and of the Council of 4 July 2012 on the control of major-accident hazards involving dangerous substances, amending and subsequently repealing Council Directive 96/82/EC Text with EEA relevance) is a European Union directive aimed at controlling major chemical accident hazards. Seveso-III is implemented in national legislation and is enforced by national chemical safety authorities. Establishments covered by Seveso are split into two categories: lower-tier and upper-tier.

The Lubrizol factory is classified as an "upper-tier" establishment under the Seveso Directive (2012/18/EU). The upper tier covers establishments with dangerous substances present in large quantities, requiring more stringent controls to prevent and minimise the consequences of major accidents. The establishment is listed in the eSPIRS database (electronic Seveso Plant Information Retrieval System).

Article 20 (Inspections) of the Seveso Directive states that, for upper-tier Seveso establishments (the biggest plants subjected to the strictest safety regime), the period between two consecutive inspections/site visits shall not exceed one year. The last date of the inspection of the Lubrizol site was 6-9-2019. The last inspection mainly focused on the process parts of the plant, whereas the fire mainly involved the storage area.

Furthermore, Article 14 states that member states shall ensure that the information referred to in Annex V of the directive is permanently available to the public, so a "safety report" and an "inventory of dangerous substances" must be made available to the public "upon request".

Member states can, however, derogate from this for reasons related to international relations, public security, or national defence. For the Lubrizol site, no inventory of dangerous substances was made publicly available prior to the accident. The full list of products was published shortly after the fire.
