= Anguilcourt-le-Sart =

- Commune
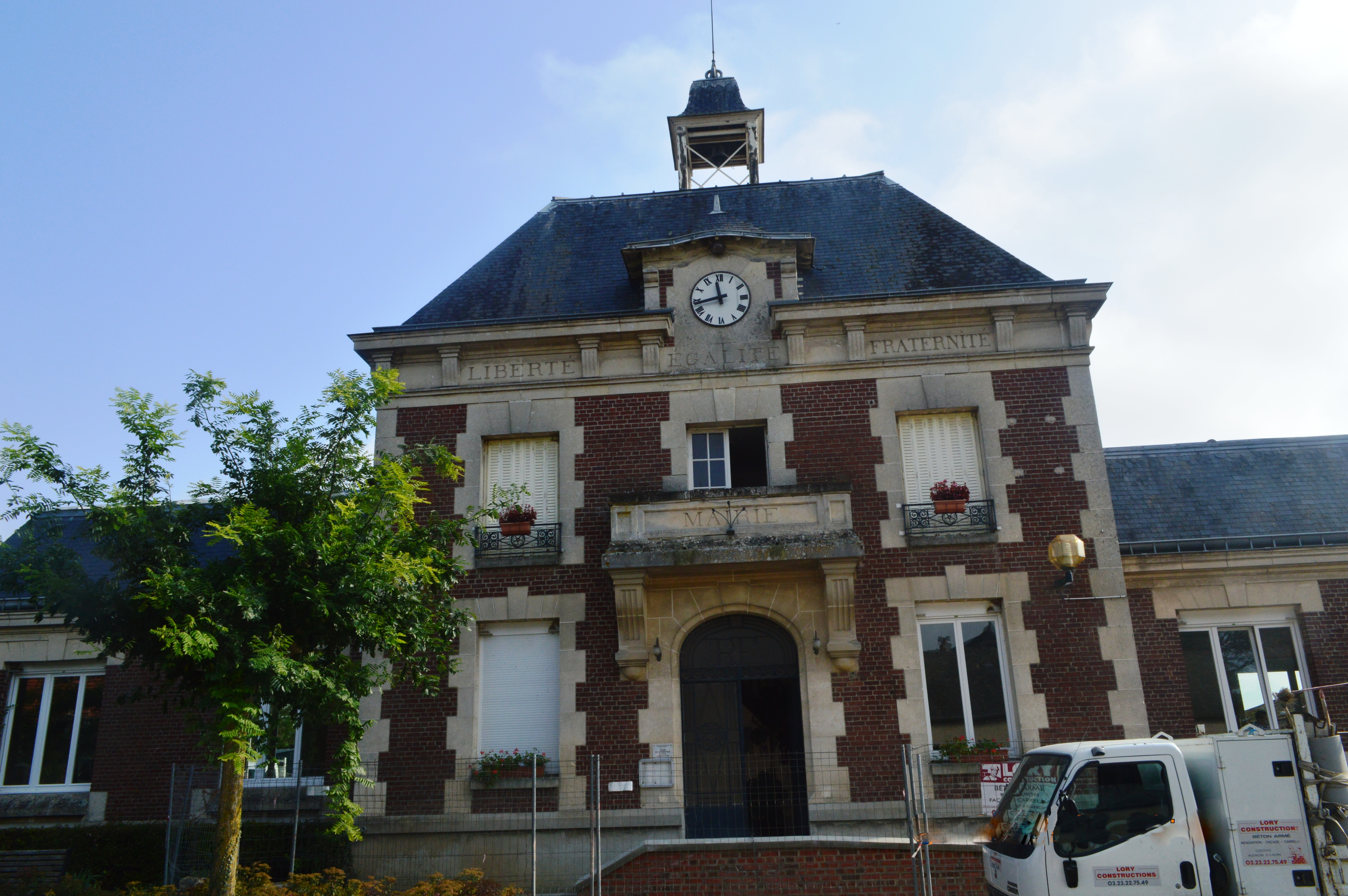
- Town hall
- Location of Anguilcourt-le-Sart
- Location within France Location within Hauts-de-France
- Coordinates: 49°41′23″N 3°26′39″E
- Country: France
- Region: Hauts-de-France
- Department: Aisne
- Arrondissement: Laon
- Canton: Tergnier
- Intercommunality: CA Chauny Tergnier La Fère

Government
  - Mayor (2026–32): Fabien Thirel
- Area^{1}: 9.14 km^{2} (3.53 sq mi)
- Elevation: 56 m (184 ft)
- Highest elevation: 111 m (364 ft)
- Lowest elevation: 50 m (160 ft)
- Population (2023): 274
  - Density: 30.0/km^{2} (77.6/sq mi)
- Time zone: UTC+01:00 (CET)
  - Summer (DST): UTC+02:00 (CEST)
- INSEE/Postal code: 02017 /02800
- ^{1} French Land Register data, which excludes lakes, ponds, glaciers > 1 km^{2} (0.386 sq mi or 247 acres) and river estuaries.

Anguilcourt-le-Sart is a commune in the department of Aisne in the Hauts-de-France region of northern France.

== Notable incidents ==
On 19 May 1983, 41 barrels of highly toxic chemical waste (dioxin-based), originating from the Seveso disaster, were found in an unused abattoir in Anguilcourt-le-Sart. The barrels, which had been illegally abandoned here by a transport contractor, were transferred the same evening to a military base near Sissonne. They were later destroyed in a high-temperature incinerator in Switzerald.

== Geography ==
Anguilcourt-le-Sart is located some 30 km southeast of Saint-Quentin and 25 km northwest of Laon. The A26 autoroute (Autoroute des Anglais, E17) from Saint-Quentin to Rheims passes through the northeastern part of the commune but has no exit in the commune. Access to the commune is by the D69 road from Renansart in the northeast passing through the heart of the commune and village and continuing south to Les Larris. The D643 road also enters the commune from Achery in the west through the village and continuing east to Nouvion-le-Comte. the commune is almost entirely farmland except for some forest in the southwest.

The Serre river flows through the commune from east to west just south of the village forming a part of the western boundary of the commune before joining the Oise at Le Travers.

=== Neighbouring communes and villages ===
Anguilcourt and Le Sart merged between 1790 and 1800.

== Population ==
Historical population
Year	Pop.	±% p.a.
1968	343	—
1975	295	−2.13%
1982	299	+0.19%
1990	278	−0.91%
1999	268	−0.41%
2007	280	+0.55%
2012	303	+1.59%
2017	315	+0.78%
2023	274	−2.30%
Source: INSEE

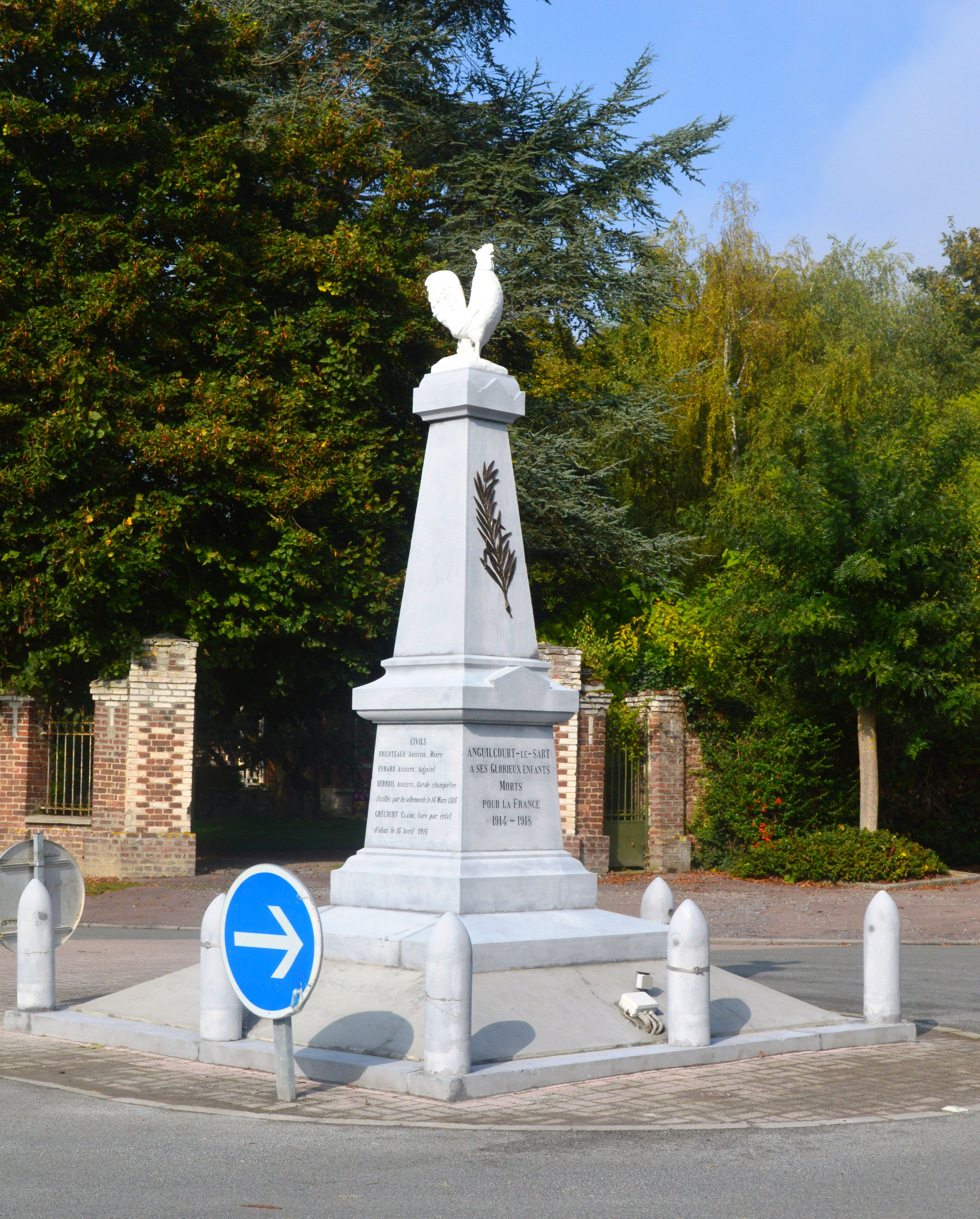
Anguilcourt-le-Sart War Memorial

== Sights ==
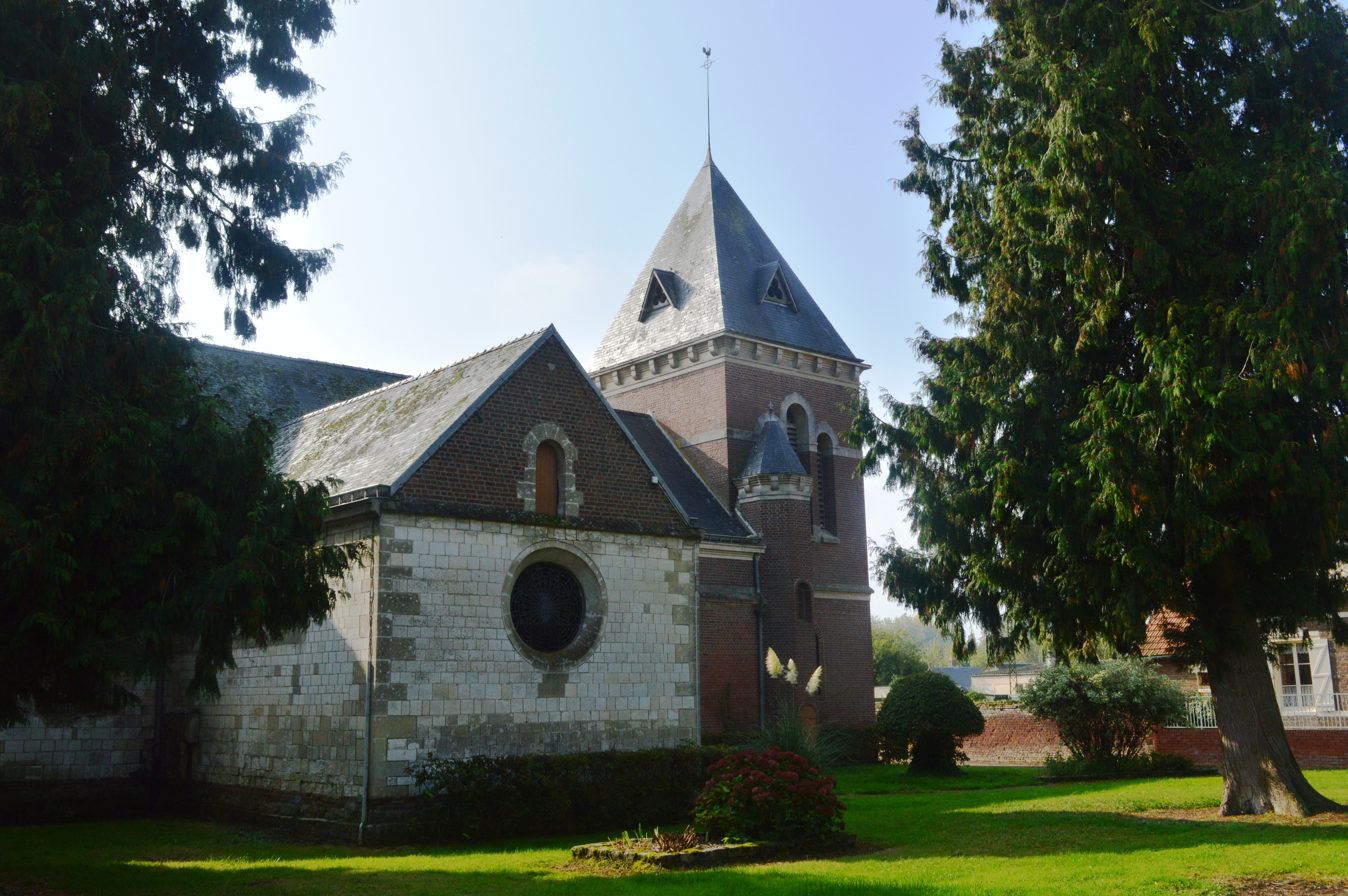
Anguilcourt-le-Sart Church

The Garden at Fort Mayot is registered as an historical monument.

== See also ==
- Communes of the Aisne department
- Seveso disaster
