= Lubrizol =

U.S. chemical company

Lubrizol Corporation
- Type: Subsidiary
- Industry: Chemicals
- Founded: 1928; 98 years ago
- Headquarters: Wickliffe, Ohio, United States
- Key people: Rebecca Liebert (president and CEO)
- Products: Specialty chemicals
- Revenue: Approximately $6.5 billion (2016)
- Owner: Berkshire Hathaway
- Number of employees: Approximately 7,000+
- Divisions: Lubrizol Additives; Lubrizol Surface Sciences; Lubrizol Engineered Materials
- Website: www.lubrizol.com

Lubrizol Corporation is a global provider of specialty chemicals for the transportation, industrial and consumer markets. These products include additives for engine oils and other transportation-related fluids, additives for industrial lubricants, and additives for gasoline and diesel fuel. In addition, Lubrizol makes ingredients and additives for personal care products, pharmaceuticals and medical devices, specialty materials, including plastics technology, and coatings in the form of specialty resins and additives.

Since 2011, Lubrizol has been a subsidiary of Berkshire Hathaway. It generated $6.5 billion in revenue in 2016 and has an employee headcount of approximately 8,300 people globally.

== History ==
The Lubrizol Corporation was founded in 1928 as The Graphite Oil Products Company in Cleveland, Ohio, by father Frank A. Nason and son Francis A. "Alex" Nason, Thomas W. James and brothers Kent H. Smith, Vincent K. Smith and A. Kelvin Smith. The company's first product was a graphite lubricant and applicator for early automobiles. In 1929, the company changed its name to The Lubri-Graph Corporation. It moved to Wickliffe, Ohio in 1931. In 1934, Lubri-Graph changed its name to The Lubri-Zol Corporation. The name changed to Lubrizol in 1943.

The company went public on the New York Stock Exchange in the 1960s. Toward the end of that decade, Lubrizol focused on developing products to help make cars cleaner and more fuel efficient. During the 1980s, the company created new additives for passenger motor oils, gear oils, hydraulic fluids and viscosity modifiers, while also eyeing biotechnology, agribusiness and specialty chemicals for other applications to expand beyond the transportation field.

Lubrizol acquired Noveon International in 2004 for US$ 920 million in cash and the assumption of US$ 920 million in debt. That move, along with others, helped Lubrizol expand beyond its additives business and create a second business segment, Lubrizol Advanced Materials, producing industrial chemicals for packaging, paints and textiles, chemicals for personal-care products such as lotions and shampoos, and additives and ingredients for engineered polymers, in addition to products for the medical devices and pharmaceutical markets.

Berkshire Hathaway announced on March 14, 2011, that it would acquire Lubrizol for US$9.7 billion in cash. This occurred just weeks after a top Berkshire executive, David Sokol, made a major bet on the stock price with his own money. Sokol resigned from Berkshire Hathaway shortly after this disclosure. That deal closed in September 2011. In December 2014, Lubrizol bought Weatherford International's engineered chemistry and drilling fluids businesses in a deal valued at US$825 million. This resulted in creation of the company's third business segment, Lubrizol Oilfield Solutions.

The company announced in February 2017 that it shut down its Oilfield Operations business segment after posting $365 million in losses.

Lubrizol's expansion in other areas of business in the 2000s included a 10-year phased investment plan launched in 2010. The plan, which sought to increase global capacity in additives, featured a plant in Zhuhai, China, among others. Additionally, the company expanded its life sciences unit with the announcement of a $60 million investment to expand its excipient, global polymer and contract manufacturing plants. The new facilities are expected to provide a flow through process for customers. Lubrizol took the majority stake in Lubrizol India Private Ltd., its Indian joint venture with Indian Oil Corp., in March 2017.

In April 2020, the company asked for Section 301 tariff relief for glutaraldehyde, which had 25% tariffs due to Trump's 2018 China–United States trade war. The company's relief application said it could be helpful as a disinfectant against COVID-19. The application made no mention of its use for fracking or the company's primary market being the oil industry.

== Operations ==
The Lubrizol Corporation is broken down into two business segments, Lubrizol Additives and Lubrizol Advanced Materials.

=== Lubrizol Additives ===
With Lubrizol Additives, the company supplies additives for transportation, including additives for lubricating engine oils, fuels and other chemicals, and industrial lubricants.

=== Lubrizol Advanced Materials ===
Lubrizol Advanced Materials creates and sells specialty materials and chemicals used in consumer products for personal care, pharmaceutical and food industries; specialty materials under the Carbopol, TempRite, Hycar and Estane trademarks; and performance coatings under the trademarks Hycar, Sancure, Algan, Performax and Myflam.

Lubrizol had operated Lubrizol Oilfield Solutions, an oilfield chemicals and drilling fluids business, following the 2014 acquisition of Weatherford International businesses. Bloomberg reported in February 2017 that Lubrizol eliminated the oilfield solutions business segment.

=== Industrial accidents ===
- On June 14, 2021, the company's Chemtool manufacturing plant in Rockton, IL suffered a large explosion and fire. A one-mile evacuation zone was established as fire agencies worked to contain the fire.

Sites in and around Rouen (France) have been the site of numerous industrial incidents:

- See fr:Incendie de l'usine Lubrizol à Rouen
- In 1975 and 1989, two incidents (similar to the one that occurred in 2013) resulted in the emission of mercaptans.
- On April 16, 2003, a fire damaged the facilities of the Oudalle factory without causing any casualties.
- On January 21, 2013, an incident occurred at the Lubrizol plant located in Rouen (Seine-Maritime): the chemical decomposition of a zinc dialkyldithiophosphate (ZDDP) tank resulted in the emission of a cloud of gas composed of a cocktail of mercaptans (probably dominated by isopropyl mercaptan), whose odor was perceptible far beyond the Rouen site by several hundred thousand people, the plume from south of London to the Paris region ("Complaints of local residents citing bad smells, headaches or nausea were thus collected by the poison and toxicovigilance centers (CAPTV) and Air normand between 21 and 22 January). The hazard study had modeled the risk of decomposition of zinc dialkyldithiophosphate, a risk also taken into account in the development of the PPRT: according to this modeling, H_{2}S can be emitted (highly toxic with fatal or irreversible effects beyond certain thresholds, thresholds not reached in the environment during the event of 21 January). This decomposition is also a source of large quantities of mercaptans, gases known to be not very toxic but whose olfactory threshold is very low (10,000 times lower than the concentrations reached in the air that day). The genes or headaches related to this type of event have not been integrated in the PPRT, but must be included in emergency plans (PPI ...). After analyzing the accident, corrective measures were submitted to CODERST (May 2013) and then imposed on the factory via a prefectural order (June 2013). These measures are: better monitoring of the temperature of the adjustment tanks, new automatic safety systems, an analysis of the stirring and refrigeration needs of the tanks (decalcification, new refrigeration means, etc.), new monitoring tools process, manufacturing and alarm, an improved process of response in case of decomposition, improvement of the measurement system of mercaptans in the stack and finally the resizing of the system treating releases to the air in case of decomposition. The implementation of these measures was verified by the DREAL on June 11 and 12, 2013. The invisible but fragrant plume of mercaptans was retrospectively modeled (publication 2015).
- On September 26, 2019, a fire broke out at the Lubrizol plant in Oudalle, near Le Havre (Seine-Maritime). 50 firefighters and 12 vehicles were mobilized.
- On September 26, 2019, explosions and a fire (major accident) impacted the company's manufacturing site in Rouen, France, in addition to a neighboring site. 240 firefighters and 200 vehicles were mobilized, including some from Paris. The authorities ordered the evacuation of the population within a radius of 500 meters around the factory, closed schools of the surrounding municipalities, and later recommended not having direct contact with the soot or eating the crops and food products exposed to it. The company created a public web page to share more on this event.

== Acquisitions and partnerships ==
Lubrizol has grown its business through a number of acquisitions and partnerships in recent years. Among them:

- Advonex (2021), chemical maker specializing in personal care industry sustainable ingredients
- Diamond Dispersions (2016), maker of water-based dye and pigment dispersions
- Particle Sciences (2015), a drug developer
- EcoQuimica (2015), maker of coatings
- Warwick Chemicals (2015), formerly produced stain-removal technologies. Closed in 2021, seven years after its acquisition in 2014.
- Alliance with Mitsui Chemicals (2014) for Lubrizol to sell and market the Lucant polymer product line
- Weatherford International's engineered chemistry and drilling fluids businesses (2014)
- Vesta (2014), maker of catheters and tubing
- Lipotec (2012), a skin care products maker
- Active Organics (2011), a specialty chemicals firm
- Chemtool (2011), maker of custom-formulated greases
- Merquinsa (2011), a maker of thermoplastic polyurethane
- Nalco Company's Nalco Performance Products Group (2011), a personal care and household care specialty polymers and formulation additives business
- Dow Chemical Co.'s thermoplastic polyurethane business (2008)
- Metalworking additives from Lockhart Chemical Co. (2007)
- Noveon (2004), producer of industrial chemicals for packaging, paints and textiles, as well as chemicals for personal-care products such as lotions and shampoos
