= Directive 96/82/EC =

- European Union directive
- Text with EEA relevance
- Title: Directive on the control of major-accident hazards involving dangerous substances
- Made by: Council
- Made under: Art. 130s (EC)
- Journal reference: L10, 14.1.1997, p.13–33
- EEA Joint Committee decision: No 709/1998

History
- Date made: 9 December 1996
- Entry into force: 3 February 1997
- Implementation date: 3 February 1999

Preparative texts
- Commission proposal: COM 94/4 Final, C106, 14.4.1994, p. 4 COM 95/240 Final
- EESC opinion: C295, 1994, p. 83
- EP opinion: C56, 1995, p. 80; C261, 1996, p. 24

Other legislation
- Replaces: Dir. 82/501/EEC
- Amended by: Dir. 2003/105/EC; Reg. (EC) No 1882/2003; Reg. (EC) No 1137/2008

Council Directive 96/82/EC of 9 December 1996 on the control of major-accident hazards involving dangerous substances (as amended) is a European Union law aimed at improving the safety of sites containing large quantities of dangerous substances. It is also known as the Seveso II Directive, after the Seveso disaster. It replaced the Seveso Directive and was in turn modified by the Seveso III directive (2012/18/EU).

== See also ==
- Seveso Directive
- Control of Major Accident Hazards Regulations 1999
