= Directive 82/501/EC =

- European Union directive
- Title: Directive on the control of major-accident hazards involving dangerous substances
- Made by: Council

Directive 82/501/EC was a European Union law aimed at improving the safety of sites containing large quantities of dangerous substances. It is also known as the Seveso Directive, after the Seveso disaster. It was superseded by the Seveso II Directive and then Seveso III directive.

== See also ==
- Seveso II Directive
- Control of Major Accident Hazards Regulations 1999
