= Glanford Power Station =

Electricity generating plant

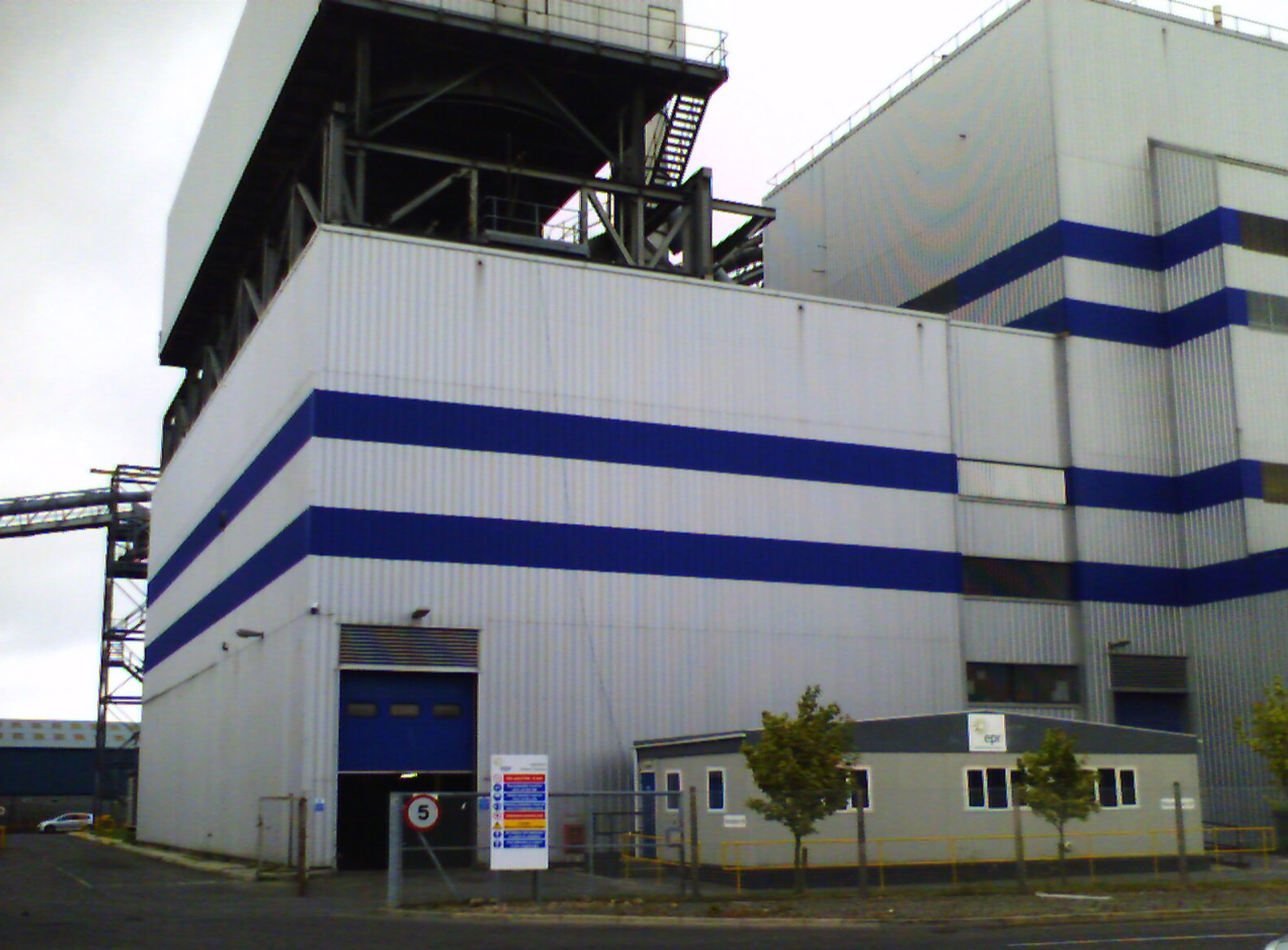
- Glanford Power Station
- Country: England
- Location: Lincolnshire, East Midlands
- Coordinates: 53.62199°N 0.700364°W
- Status: Operational
- Commission date: 1993
- Operator: Fibrogen

Thermal power station
- Primary fuel: Biofuel

Power generation
- Nameplate capacity: 13.5 MW

External links
- Commons: Related media on Commons

Glanford Power Station is an electricity generating plant located on the Flixborough industrial estate near Scunthorpe in North Lincolnshire. It generates around 13.5 megawatts (MW) of electricity, which is enough to provide power to about 32,000 homes. It was designed to generate electricity by the burning of poultry litter, and was only the second of this kind of power station in the world to have been built when it went into operation in 1993. The station is owned by Energy Power Resources (EPR) and operated by its subsidiary Fibrogen.

== History ==
After the BSE crisis in the 1980s, millions of cattle were slaughtered, and almost half a million tons of dried meat and bone meal (MBM), the cause of the disease, was stockpiled in secure sheds. Glanford Power Station was re-commissioned in May 2000 to burn them. It charges a gate fee for the fuel it burns, which would have otherwise been disposed of using conventional landfills. MBM has around two thirds the energy value of fossil fuels such as coal, and has been labelled carbon neutral. Despite producing "green energy", Glanford Power Station is listed as the 27th largest arsenic air emitter in England and Wales in an air quality report published in February 2000.

In January 2004 Glanford Power Plant received planning permission for the site to be extended to allow other sources of biomass to be burned. The plant technology is based on a conventional moving grate boiler and steam cycle.

In accordance with the United Kingdom Government's new Renewables Obligation incentive mechanism, a premium is paid for renewable electricity generation. Each renewable generator is issued with Renewables Obligation Certificates (ROC), which they may sell to other electricity supply companies. This trade allows them to meet their obligation for the proportion of supplied electricity generated from renewable sources. The power output from the Glanford plant qualifies for ROC trading.

The combustion ashes produced by the station are then disposed of via landfill (21% of fuel by mass). Before the switch to MBM, they used to be sold as agricultural fertiliser.
