= Control of Major Accident Hazards Regulations 2015 =

United Kingdom health and safety legislation

- Statutory Instrument
- Parliament of the United Kingdom
- Citation: SI 2015/483

Dates
- Made: 2 March 2015
- Laid before Parliament: 9 March 2015
- Commencement: 1 June 2015

Other legislation
- Made under: European Communities Act 1972; Health and Safety at Work etc. Act 1974
- Transposes: Directive 2012/18/EU

Text of statute as originally enacted

Text of the Control of Major Accident Hazards Regulations 2015 as in force today (including any amendments) within the United Kingdom, from legislation.gov.uk.

The Control of Major Accident Hazards Regulations 2015 (SI 2015/483) (COMAH) are the enforcing regulations within the United Kingdom of the Seveso III Directive devised in Brussels following the Seveso disaster. They are applicable to any establishment storing or otherwise handling large quantities of industrial chemicals of a hazardous nature. Types of establishments include chemical warehousing, chemical production facilities and some distributors.
