= Directive 2012/18/EU =

European Union directive

Directive 2012/18/EU or the Seveso-III Directive (full title: Directive 2012/18/EU of the European Parliament and of the Council of 4 July 2012 on the control of major-accident hazards involving dangerous substances, amending and subsequently repealing Council Directive 96/82/EC) is a European Union directive aimed at controlling major chemical accident hazards. It is implemented in national legislation and is enforced by national chemical safety authorities.

The Seveso-III Directive aims at preventing such incidents and minimising their risks. All EU countries are obliged to adopt measures at national and company level to prevent major accidents and to ensure appropriate preparedness and response should such accidents happen. Industrial plants in the European Union are covered by its provisions if dangerous substances are or could be present in the "establishment" in quantities exceeding its stated thresholds. More than 12,000 establishments in the EU are covered by the requirements.

Seveso-III replaces the previous Seveso-I (Directive 82/501/EC) and Seveso-II (Directive 96/82/EC), updating the laws due to changes in chemical classification regulations, for example. Seveso-III gets its name from the Seveso disaster, which occurred in 1976 in Italy. Seveso-III establishes minimum quantity thresholds for reporting and safety permits.

== Covered establishments ==
Today more than 12,000 establishments in the EU are covered by the Seveso-III Directive.

Establishments covered by Seveso are split into two categories:

- Lower-tier: Dangerous substances are present above a certain threshold set out in Annex I of the Directive.
- Upper-tier: Establishments with dangerous substances present in even greater quantities, requiring more stringent controls to prevent and minimise the consequences of major accidents.

The main sectors covered are power generation, supply and distribution (13% of establishments); fuel storage (10%); general chemicals manufacture (9%) and wholesale and retail (8%).

=== Major accidents ===
The Lubrizol factory fire in Rouen in 2019 was followed by the 2020 Chemical Industries of Ethylene Oxide explosion in Tarragona.

== Obligations ==
=== All establishment operators ===
- Notify the competent authority about the inventory of dangerous substances, specifying the quantities, physical form and the hazardous properties of the dangerous substances present in the establishment
- Draw-up a major accident prevention policy (MAPP)
- Implement a MAPP by appropriate means and a Safety Management System
- Provide information to the competent authorities to identify the risks for domino effects
- Produce a safety report for upper-tier establishments
- Produce internal emergency plans for upper tier establishments

=== Member State authorities ===
- Produce external emergency plans for upper tier establishments (Article 12)
- Deploy land-use planning for the siting of establishments
- Make relevant information publicly available
- Ensure that any necessary action is taken after an accident including emergency measures, actions to ensure that the operator takes any necessary remedial measures and informing the persons likely to the affected
- Report the number of establishments (both tiers) to the Commission
- Report accidents to the Commission
- Prohibit the unlawful use or operation of establishments
- Conduct inspections
- Maintain or adopt stricter measures than those contained in the Seveso Directive

== Citizen's rights ==
- The public needs to be consulted and involved in the decision making for specific individual projects
- Member State authorities need to make available information held
- Access to justice needs to be granted in case the above rights have been infringed

Citizens who live in an area potentially affected by a major accident involving dangerous substances, the EU legislation requires that Citizens are involved in the decision making, even if the establishment concerned is located in a neighbouring EU country.

Citizens will be consulted when:

- new establishments are planned
- significant modifications are made to existing ones
- new developments are planned around existing establishments
- external emergency plans are drawn up for high risk establishments
