= TetraKO =

Sprayable fire suppression agent

- Material type: fire suppression agent

Physical properties
- Density (ρ): ~1.0 g/cm^{3}

TetraKO is a fire suppression agent marketed by EarthClean Corporation, based in South St. Paul, Minnesota. It takes the form of a white powder, which is intended to be mixed with water and sprayed on structures or foliage using unmodified firefighting equipment, up to a day in advance of a wildfire.

== Mechanism of action ==
TetraKO forms an aqueous gel that exhibits low viscosity under pressure, allowing it to be sprayed like water. It adheres to structure surfaces, including walls and ceilings, trapping moisture against the surface. Like Class A foams, it is intended to improve the wetting effectiveness of water used in fire suppression. When heated, it releases a dense steam which suppresses fire by displacing oxygen.

In wildfire and structure fire tests, TetraKO performed better than both plain water and water mixed with Class A foam concentrate.

== Composition and safety ==
The primary ingredient in TetraKO is corn starch; it also contains polymer ingredients which improve its ability to act as a non-Newtonian fluid. The product is certified non-toxic and biodegradable, unlike many common firefighting foams.
