= Tacoa disaster =

1982 oil tank fire in Venezuela

- Date: December 19, 1982
- Venue: Ricardo Zuloaga thermal power plant
- Location: Tacoa, Vargas, Venezuela; 10°34′59″N 67°04′49″W
- Type: Boilover
- Cause: Presence of undrained water layer in a fuel oil tank
- Deaths: ca. 150
- Property damage: ca. 50 million USD

The Tacoa disaster (Spanish: tragedia de Tacoa) occurred on December 19, 1982 as a result of a fuel oil tank fire on the premises of the Ricardo Zuloaga thermal power plant, owned by Electricidad de Caracas and located in Tacoa, a seaside village and an area of Vargas, Venezuela.

There were 150 or more victims, amongst them many firemen, journalists and bystanders. All but two (who were killed in the initial tank explosion) fell as a result of a massive boilover from one of the affected tanks. It is the deadliest industrial accident ever occurred in Venezuela and the deadliest tank fire ever occurred worldwide.

== The accident ==
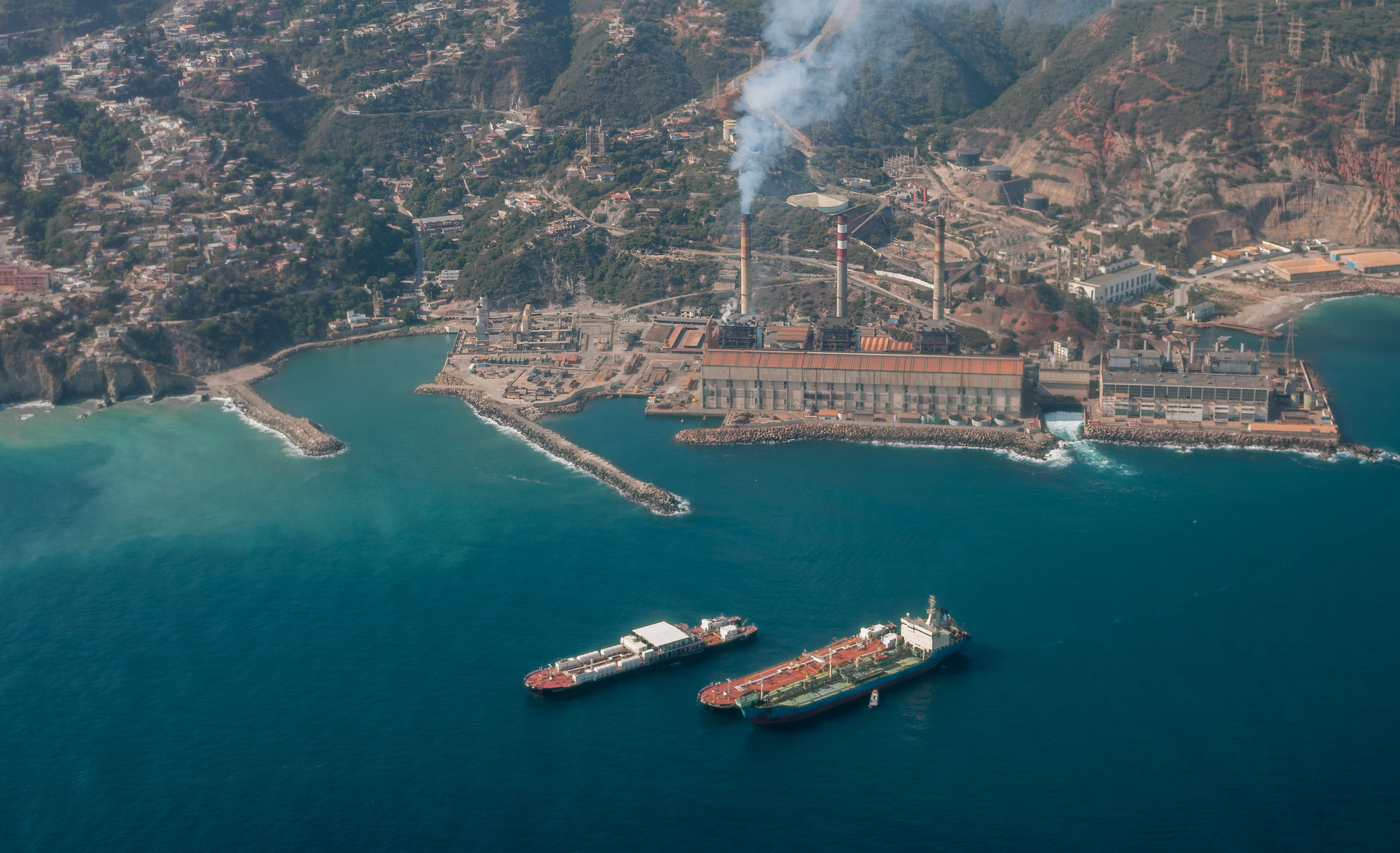
The Ricardo Zuloaga power plant in 2013. Tanks nos. 8 and 9 were located on high ground, behind the main building.

At dawn, on Sunday, December 19, 1982, the sea-going tanker Murachi belonging to Maraven, a subsidiary of PDVSA, was moored off the Ricardo Zuloaga power plant in Tacoa and about to unload 15,000 tons of fuel oil, which would be used as fuel for power production. Two plant operators climbed atop tank no. 8, a 55 m diameter, 17 m high cylindrical atmospheric tank located on a hill, which was scheduled to receive the fuel, for routine checks in preparation for the operation, including a reading of the level in the tank. When they opened the gauging hatch, hot hydrocarbon vapors interspersed with the air creating an explosive mixture. A massive explosion ripped off the tank's conical roof and killed the two operators carrying out the checks. A tank fire started, which extended to secondary fires in the containment bunding.

It is unclear what the source of ignition might have been, although it is speculated that it could be a non-intrinsically safe lamp or even a match used to illuminate the level dip tube. The liquid stored in the tank (no. 6 fuel oil, also known as residual fuel oil or bunker C) is non-flammable, as its flash point is 71°C, well above ambient temperature. However, in the conditions in which it was stored on that day, it became flammable, although the mechanism by which this occurred is not fully confirmed. The tank was heated by several steam coils in order to keep the highly viscous fluid in pumpable conditions. On the night of December 18, a high-temperature alarm for tank no. 8 had gone off, indicating excessive heating. One of the steam coils was isolated in response. Apart from the contribution of the higher temperature, it is possible that inappropriate blending of the fuel oil was responsible for the presence of lighter components with low flash point.

It soon became clear that Electricidad de Caracas had no contingency plans for a fire in their fuel oil storage tanks. The company lacked a fire brigade, and their staff had no training or instruction. The emergency response was delayed by more than 20 minutes as the first fire engines navigated tortuous roads to reach the remote site. Firefighting apparatus and personnel arrived from across the region over the next few hours, including firemen from the port of La Guaira and the nearby Simón Bolívar International Airport in Maiquetía. Most of the equipment was however unable to access the elevated fire site. Under any circumstances, extinguishing an open tank fire of that size would have been extremely difficult; lack of water and foam made this task impossible. The order was given to let the tank burn itself out. However, given the intensity of the fire, action was still required to prevent spread to the neighboring dikes. During the morning, more than 100 firefighters were employed, later joined by more intervention personnel from other entities, including the Guardia Nacional, Metropolitan Police, and PDVSA technicians among others. Media personnel, including from Venezolana de Televisión and El Universal newspaper, arrived at the site to provide news coverage.

Around noon, authorities reported that the situation was under control. However, at 12:45 pm, a massive boilover occurred, i.e. a violent overflow due to rapid boiling and vaporization of a layer of water that was found below the fuel oil. Like an erupting volcano, the tank spewed out a huge lava of blazing liquid that fell on the firefighters and the bystanders. The origin of the water at the bottom of the tank is unclear. At first, the firefighters were blamed for having poured water into the tank, but this theory was later disproved. There is now some consensus that small amounts of water were normally found in the fuel oil at each filling operation, then accumulating at the bottom of the tank due to gravity. The layer of water was drained periodically, but as of the day of the accident this operation had not been carried out for a long time. Also, it is not clear why the water was not drained during the fire; it is possible that the drain valves were surrounded by flames, or perhaps emptying the water was not considered necessary because the risk of boilover was not anticipated.

Theoretically, heavy fuel oil should not be prone to boilover. In order for a boilover to occur, the burning hydrocarbon mixture must have a wide range of boiling points, including a substantial proportion of volatile components, along with highly viscous residue. This combination is present in most crude oils but seldom in other petroleum products. It is therefore theorized that it was the blending of the fuel oil with light fractions that, apart from rendering the hydrocarbon mixture flammable, also made it prone to boilover.

Contributing to the onset of the boilover may have been the poor design of the containment bunding or failure to maintain the bunding drainage channels unobstructed; this caused continued pool fires to burn around the lower part of the tank, where water had accumulated.

The inferno set fire to people, houses, trees, parked vehicles and boats floating in the sea about 250 meters from the place. Molten asphalt from the roads mingled with the oil creating a noxious mixture which continued to flow downhill, destroying everything in its path. A decisive factor that contributed to the extensive damage radius of the boilover was its location atop a hill, immediately inland of the power station building. This allowed for the blazing hydrocarbon to reach longer distances while airborne and further spread downhill once it impacted the ground. Consideration of terrain features when selecting location of tanks was later stressed as one of the lessons learnt from the accident.

The exact death toll is unknown; however, estimates are usually above 150. Of these, there were 40 uniformed firefighters, dozens of civil defense workers, 17 plant employees, 10 media workers, and scores of civilians. The fire in tank no. 8 was extinguished by the sudden inrush of air during the boilover. However, as the burning oil flowed over into the downhill containment dike, this resulted in a sustained fire around tank no. 9, another heavy fuel oil tank. As a precaution against another boilover occurring in tank no. 9, the army evacuated 40,000 people from the area. The fire in tank no. 9 burnt out two to three days later.

== Aftermath ==
President of Venezuela Luis Herrera Campins declared a national mourning and promised there would be an exhaustive investigation. The presidential commission presented the results of the investigation on May 30, 1983, but only one year later the report was divulged to the general public (and only some parts of it). The government alleged that secrecy was necessary in order not to compromise the decision of the investigative judge Carlos Soucre.

Most of the findings that transpired from the investigation underscored Electricidad de Venezuela's multiple severe process safety failures:

- Temperature control in tank no. 8 was not adequate. This led to excessive heating of the fuel oil above its flash point (the plant historian indicated temperatures up to 88°C in the tank), which contributed to the fuel oil becoming flammable.
- Remote level reading was faulty, which made it necessary to perform manual reading in situ. This led to the opening of the tank and the consequent flammable atmosphere ignition.
- The plant did not have a fire detection system.
- Maintenance of the fire protection equipment and facility was not conducted. In particular the foam distribution pipework was corroded and some of the fire pumps were not functional.
- Additionally, the fire water system did not have connections compatible with the hoses of the firemen that intervened.
- Access to the tanks was inadequate, which made it difficult for firemen and apparatus to reach the fire site.

The report also pointed out that surrounding the tanks were many houses, which should not have been allowed by the authorities. Soucre's decision, however, did not identify individual responsibilities. The case passed to a higher court led by judge María Teresa Salazar, who in December 1984 issued eight arrest warrants against executives of the company with charges of manslaughter, but no one ever went to jail.

Additional findings and recommendations reported in the literature are:

- Accumulation of water in hydrocarbon tanks should be avoided. This is achieved by ensuring the tank roof is watertight and free-draining; gauging hatches and roof manheads are kept closed; steam coils are tested for leakage; etc.
- Blending of light fractions in heavier petroleum products should be avoided.
- The terrain configuration should be considered when selecting the location for large atmospheric tanks. High ground should be avoided.

In time, Electricidad de Caracas implemented changes to address the findings. Overall, the disaster contributed to better knowledge and heightened awareness of the hazards associated with boilover in petroleum products storage tanks.
