= Carrickmines fire =

2015 multi-fatality fire near Dublin, Ireland

Carrickmines Fire
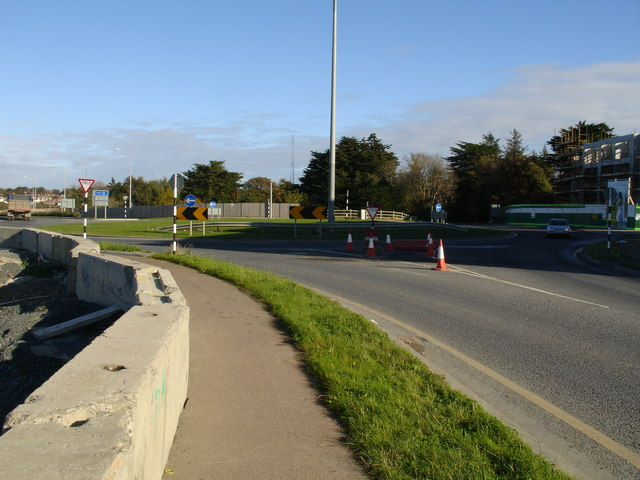
- Carrickmines Roundabout, near the fire site
- Date: October 10, 2015
- Location: Glenamuck Road, Carrickmines, Dún Laoghaire–Rathdown, Ireland; 53.2423°N 6.1901°W
- Type: Fire
- Cause: Chip pan slopover
- Deaths: 11 (including 1 unborn child)

Carrickmines fire (Dublin)

On Saturday, 10 October 2015, a blaze swept through a halting site at Carrickmines in County Dublin, Ireland. It proved fatal. This was the country's deadliest such disaster since the Stardust fire. The fire led to a debate about the squalid conditions in which many members of the Irish travelling community live.

Taoiseach Enda Kenny visited the scene and announced that flags would be flown at half-mast. Books of condolence were opened throughout the country. President Michael D. Higgins and his wife Sabina Higgins passed people of all ages queuing outside the Mansion House to sign a book there. Those who died were also honoured at vigils throughout the country. The Society of Saint Vincent de Paul set up an emergency fund for the families of those affected.

Crowds travelled from across Ireland and from neighbouring Britain to attend the funerals of the first five victims of the fire at the Church of the Most Holy Redeemer in Bray on 20 October 2015. A letter from Pope Francis was read towards the close and dignitaries present included the Tánaiste, Joan Burton, and representatives of Taoiseach Kenny and President Higgins. Relatives of those who died later met Pope Francis in the Vatican.
