= Wax burning =

Heating of candle wax for entertainment

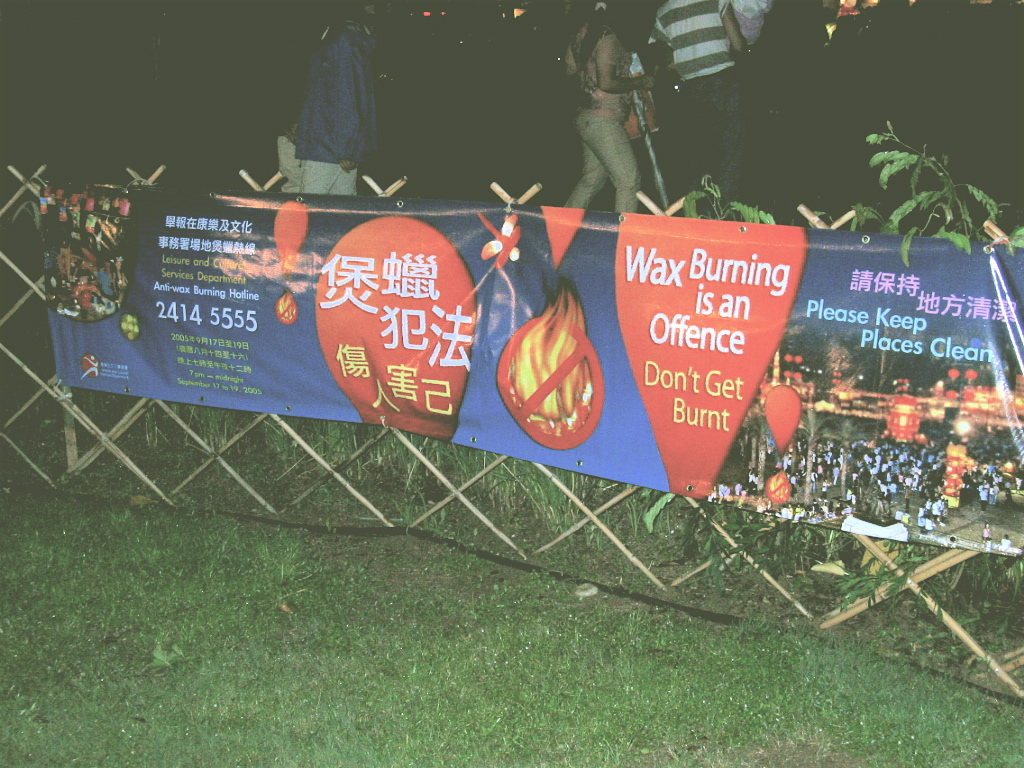
Government banner warning against wax burning

Wax burning (Chinese: 煲蠟; Jyutping: bou1 laap6), also known as wax boiling, is the heating of candle wax to high temperatures in a container as a form of entertainment.

Most of the time, it refers to a local tradition of Hong Kong youths during the Mid-Autumn Festival period in public parks or other such areas. One would use an empty moon cake tin as the container to bring candle wax to the boil, possibly adding newspaper scraps or other flammable fuel. Once the wax fire reaches its peak, one would pour water onto the flames thus creating spectacular sizzling and steam slopover. This practice is dangerous due to the flames' kickback and volatile amount of flowing hot wax, possibly causing third degree burns; several children have been taken to the hospital each year due to "wax burning" related injuries. The annual numbers are in decline due to legislation and public education campaigns (see below).

== Attitude of the Hong Kong government to wax burning ==
As there are many revellers during the Mid-Autumn Festival, the Hong Kong Police Force has previously paid little attention to wax boiling, and hence many local youths see the festival as a chance for "legal fire-setting". However, due to the amounts of leftover melted wax in public areas and the inherent danger of the practice, in 1990 the Hong Kong Government began issuing public announcements to citizens not to boil wax. The Leisure and Cultural Services Department began patrolling public parks and areas during the three-day festival period, requesting citizens not to light too many candles at once and to prevent wax burning.

A law was implemented in 2003 prohibiting "melt or burn any wax or sprinkle or pour any liquid onto any hot wax, in such a manner as to cause or as to be likely to cause a risk of injury to any person or damage to any property" in public parks, beaches or barbecue areas. Offenders face a maximum penalty of HK$2,000 and 14 days imprisonment. The Housing Department (HD) also prohibits the practice, claiming that five points deduction and a $1,500 fixed penalty notice will be imposed on offenders in its public housing estates. Leaving behind wax stains in public places will also fall under "littering" and is liable to a HK$3000 fine.
