= Bunding =

Retaining wall around pollution source

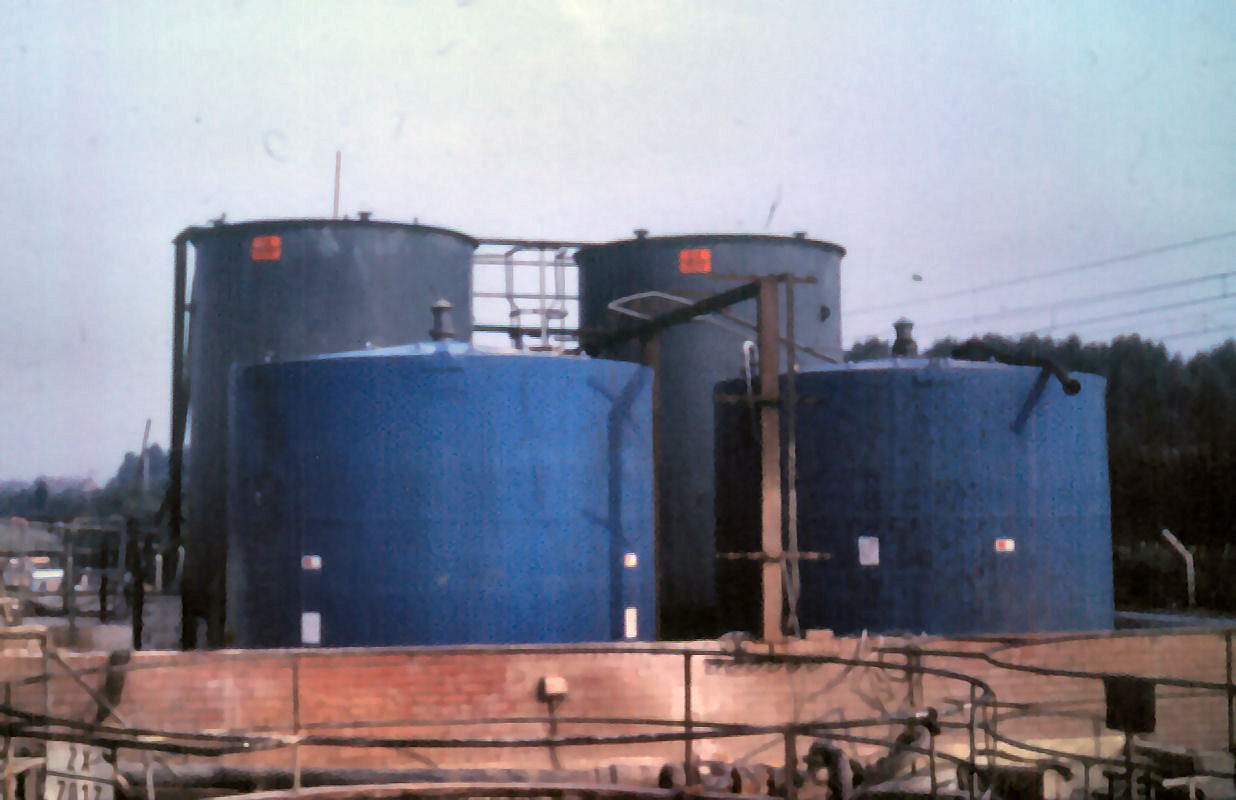
Acid storage tanks inside a brick bund wall

Bunding, also called a bund wall, is a constructed retaining wall around storage "where potentially polluting substances are handled, processed or stored, for the purposes of containing any unintended escape of material from that area until such time as a remedial action can be taken."

== Liquid containment ==
The term can also refer to dikes, but it is frequently used to describe liquid containment facilities that prevent leaks and spillage from tanks and pipes, though sometimes any barrier is referred to as bunding. Frequently, the liquids in these tanks and pipes are toxic, and bunding is used to prevent the liquid from causing damage (either by force or its chemistry). If a large tank has a catastrophic failure, the liquid alone can cause extensive damage.

If built properly, bunding is large enough and strong enough to contain the contents of an entire tank, though regulations may require it to be up to a third larger. When multiple tanks share a bund, the capacity is based on the largest tank. One of the most common designs for large tanks is a concrete or masonry wall around the tank with a concrete floor.

Concrete works very well for many liquids, but it is unsuitable for some applications like containing strong acids. Using earth berms for bunding is not recommended for most situations, though liners can be used to decrease permeability. Smaller tanks often use containers made of steel or plastic. The material used depends on cost, the chemical properties of the liquid and its density. Plastic tanks cannot hold very dense liquids at high wall levels. Large, exposed bunding will need a sump pump or some other system to remove precipitation, though it may also be used to transfer spilled liquid into another container. Rainwater must be treated if the liquid being stored is toxic because there may be small amounts of it surrounding the tank.

The bund may have a roof to prevent precipitation from getting in, but steps must be taken to provide adequate ventilation when storing flammable liquids. If the wall is over a meter high, it may require a ladder or steps to allow people to escape quickly. Another design uses a channel that drains the liquid to a secondary container.

When the risk of tank failure is not as likely or when it would not cause extensive damage, the bunding may be designed to merely contain small leaks from hoses and valves. This bunding may not be able to contain the entire volume of the tank. Plastic and steel are used, but another common method is making a hump or lip around the perimeter of a concrete floor. Some bunding is temporary, such as short-term chemical storage in the field. A hump or slope type bunding is helpful when vehicles need access to the area. There is also a type of bunding that compresses when a vehicle passes over and expands once it has passed.

== Regulations ==
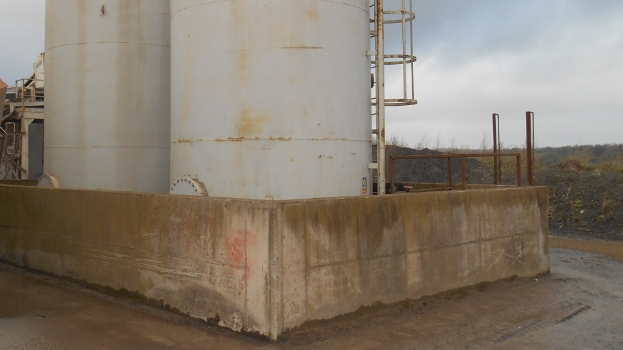
Bund around the base of a tank

Bunding is a legal requirement in many countries, particularly around tanks, storage vessels and other plants that contain liquids which may be dangerous or hazardous to the environment. Particular examples which receive specific attention in the UK, the rest of Europe and the USA are oil and fuel storage tanks and transformers at electricity sub-stations which are filled with oil for cooling and insulation purposes. In the UK commercial installations exceeding 200 litres and domestic installations exceeding 2500 litres require a bunded tank to comply with Environment Agency 'control of pollution regulations'.

It is reasonably easy to construct a "water-tight" bund around the base of a tank or vessel. A concrete base and a sealed wall of masonry, brickwork, concrete or even prefabricated steel provides the holding capacity

=== Holding capacity ===
Almost all regulations require a holding capacity of 110% of the largest tank within the bund or 25% of the total capacity of all the tanks within the bund, whichever is the greatest. In addition, further guidelines in some countries (e.g. the UK) recommend additional measures such as providing sufficient "freeboard" or height of wall above the maximum holding capacity to accommodate dynamic factors such as a surge in situations of major tank failure or storm-driven waves in larger bunds. As a rule (and unless specific local laws prevail) most operators work to the 25%/110% capacity guide.

=== Unwanted water build-up and removal ===
As noted above, electricity sub-station transformers contain significant amounts of oil. A 110 MVA transformer may have up to 40,000 litres of cooling/insulating oil contained within the body of the transformer and its associated coiling radiators and storage tanks. Unlike ordinary fuel storage tanks, these are complex structures, with a higher propensity for leakage of the oil. Using the UK as an example, as electricity industry privatization took place in the 1980s and 1990s the new electricity companies were made aware of their environmental responsibilities. Most area and national companies realised that they had several thousand transformers, many of which had been leaking into the ground below them for many years. The companies embarked on an upgrading programme involving the construction of "water-tight" bunds to retain any oil leakage and to prevent further pollution and contamination.

They immediately encountered the problem of water build-up from rain being retained by the now "water-tight" bund; the unwanted rain-water reduces the holding capacity of the bund. Once the water level reaches more than 10% of the holding capacity of the bund, it is no longer fit for purpose and the water must be removed. The water is also likely to be, at best, moderately contaminated with a small film of oil on the top of it or, at worst, substantially contaminated by a thick layer of oil. This is worse on older, leakier transformers. This also can apply to any oil storage tank

Oil floats on water and, if still clean enough to see through, has a different refractive index than the water below, making the oil/water interface difficult to judge. This makes manual pumping difficult and unsafe. Removing the entire contents for disposal as hazardous waste is expensive and environmentally unacceptable. However, in the UK at least, the latest regulations require some formal method to be put in place for the removal of the rainwater. One of the systems recommended is an automatic pump system which is able to discriminate between oil and water. A good system should work continuously and automatically and must fail to safety (e.g. not pumping). It should also provide alarms for conditions such as high water (indicative of pump or system failure) and high oil to warn that action to skim off the waste oil should now be done. These automatic pump systems are usually referred to as "BundGuards".

== Anti-noise ==
In the UK, manmade earthwork structures are sometimes constructed around housing developments, especially near industrial sites. The mounds of earth with vegetation (normally shrubs and trees) diminish the noise from the industrial site. The bunds then create a more natural landscape instead of thick or high barriers. They can be built in curved or sinuous forms, depending on the landscape. Bunds are also used to protect housing from noisy transport routes such as motorways and railways.

== Re-greening ==
Allegedly bunds can be used to hold rainwater in lightly sloping plains that have lost vegetation due to drought and overgrazing. According to this theory, semi-circular bunds will hold the rainwater giving it time to penetrate the soil and rehydrate the seeds in the ground.

== Failures ==
Bund wall failures have occurred in the UK, such as at Warrington, Cheshire in 1994. A polypropylene tank holding about 30 tonnes of 40% aqueous caustic soda sprang a leak about halfway down the main wall. The corrosive fluid jetted out over the bund wall, causing great damage to the surrounding factory and adjacent premises. The bunding at Buncefield also failed to contain petrol and fire fighting water after the initial explosion and subsequent fire.

Bunded containment is generally not designed for tank boilover, because this would require to cover an enormous footprint, as clearly demonstrated by accidents such as the Tacoa disaster. It is therefore paramount that boilover be prevented in the first place.

== Integrity assessments ==
Bunds will deteriorate over time (e.g. cracks may develop in concrete walls or reinforcement bars may corrode) or suffer damage (e.g. vehicle strikes) or modifications may have been made. To ensure that bunds continue to provide the necessary protection against leaks and spills, bunds should be assessed periodically to ensure that they continue to provide sufficient integrity (e.g. will not leak).

National and local regulations often specify the frequency and method of bund integrity assessment. In the UK, for sites licensed by the Environmental Agency, the integrity assessment is normally annually. In Ireland, for sites licensed by the EPA, the integrity assessment is normally every three years. The actual permit or license for the site will normally specify the assessment interval.

There are two assessment techniques in use, hydrostatic testing, and visual inspection. In certain circumstances, both techniques may be used.

=== Hydrostatic tests ===
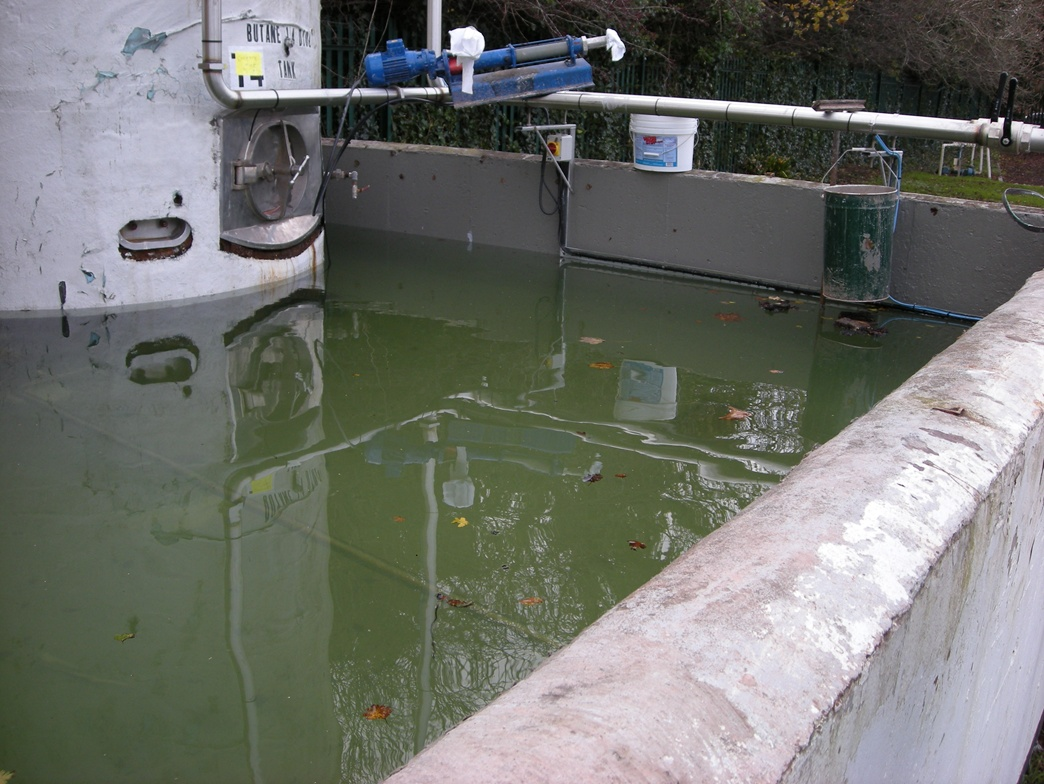
Existing bund being hydrostatically tested

The general principles of hydrostatic tests are described in. These general steps consist of:

- Filling the bund with water to a level that corresponds to the design capacity of the bund.
- Allowing a period of absorption of water into the walls of the bund.
- The test itself.
- Assessment of test result.
- Disposal of the test water.

=== Visual inspection ===
A visual inspection requires that a competent person examine the bund to determine whether the bund, in their opinion, is in a suitable condition to retain the primary containment contents in case of a spill. The examination will include a visual inspection of the inner and outer walls and the bund base. In particular, joints in the walls and base will be examined and also where pipes penetrate bund walls. Any defects that are likely to cause a leak are noted.

The definition of a competent person may be defined in the permit but is generally considered to refer to a Chartered Engineer with appropriate experience

Where there is doubt as to the integrity, then the visual inspection may be supplemented by a low-level hydrostatic test.

=== New bunds ===
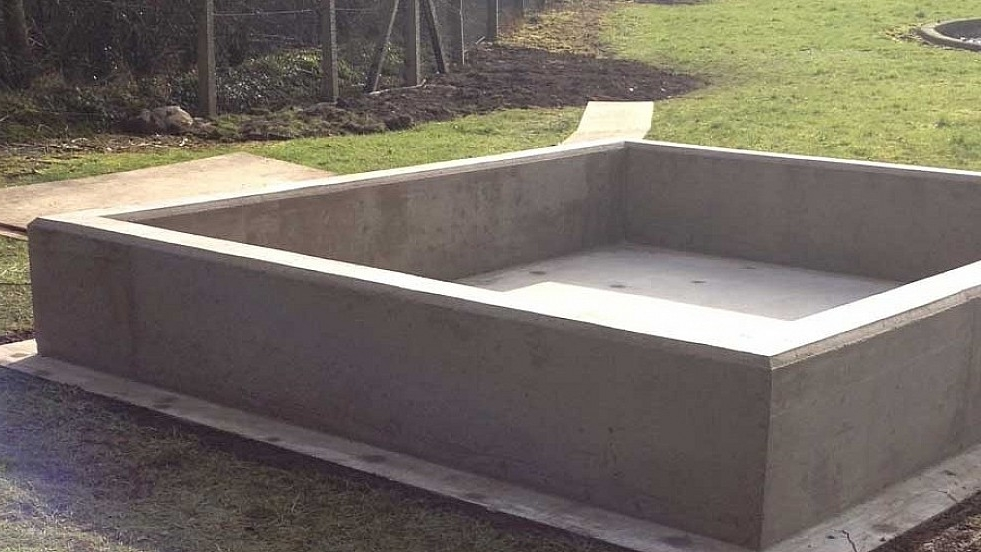
A new concrete bund ready for integrity test

All new bunds should be tested before they enter service. Test methods are usually specified in the design code used to design the bunds. Two design codes have been historically used throughout the UK and Ireland, BS8007:1987 and CIRIA163. BS8007:1989 has now been withdrawn and replaced by BS EN 1992-3:2006. However, this withdrawn standard is still extensively referenced by many regulators and the testing requirements are identical in both standards. It is important that this testing is carried out before tanks, pumps or other equipment is placed in the bund. This is because tanks may try to float and thus become unstable and other equipment may be damaged by water immersion.

Prefabricated bunds will have generally been tested at the factory where they are made and therefore should be accompanied by a test certificate.

=== Existing bunds ===
The guidance for assessment of existing bunds differs significantly between the UK and Ireland. In the UK, visual inspection for existing bunds is the preferred assessment method. This is due to concerns re-tank stability and the possibility of promoting corrosion of the base of the tank. In Ireland, for site regulated by the EPA, hydrostatic testing is the preferred method unless there are safety or practical reasons why a hydrostatic test cannot be carried out

Potential reasons as to why a hydrostatic test may be unsafe or impractical include:

- Tank stability. Tanks may try to float and may become unstable.
- Corrosion of tank base.
- Flooding of electrical equipment within bund.
- Displacement of flammable or toxic gases that have built up in a bund.
- Tank contents may react with test water.
- Impeded site operations, e.g. warehouses or other storage areas that need frequent access.
- Lack of containment capacity should the tank fail during the test.
- Use of excessive quantity of water.

In some cases, it may be necessary to test joints and bund penetrations (such as by pipes) for watertightness using a limpet dam or similar.

Specialist applied chemical resistant bund linings may also be recommended which enhances the structural strength and defence of the bund.

== See also ==
- Secondary spill containment
- Storage tanks
- Contour plowing
- Spill pallet
