= Chip pan =

Steep cooking pan used for deep-frying

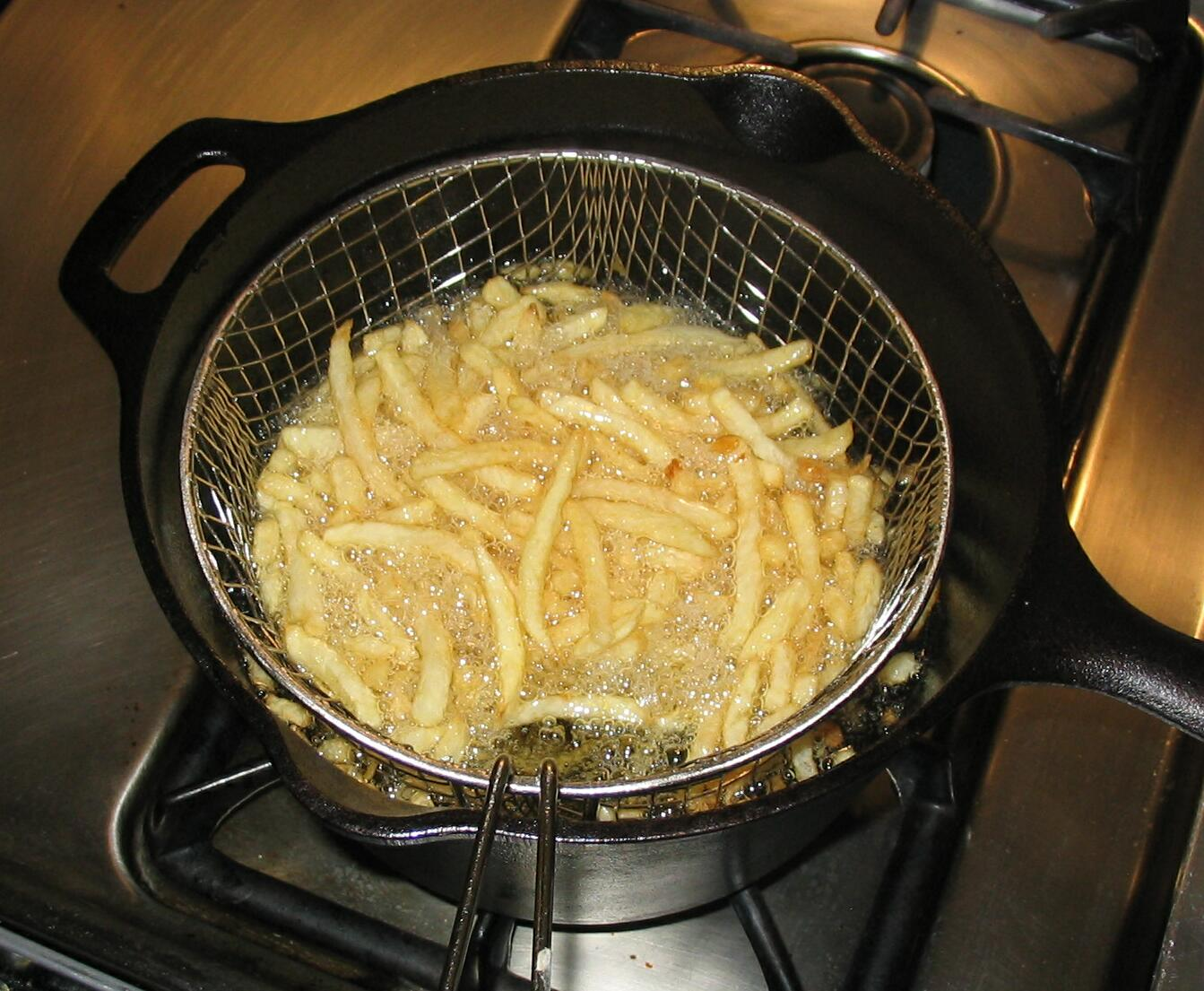
A cast iron chip pan with an aluminium basket being used to fry french fries.

A chip pan is a deep-sided cooking pan used for deep-frying. Chip pans are named for their traditional use in frying chips (called "French fries" in the United States).

Today, they are made from either aluminium or stainless steel, although in the past were commonly made from cast iron. A basket is placed inside the pan, to lower the chips into the hot cooking oil, and to raise them once cooked.

Chip pans are commonly used in the United Kingdom and Republic of Ireland, although are slowly being rendered obsolete by deep fryers.

== Manufacture ==
Chip pans are commonly manufactured through a spinning process, as the metal used is malleable. The lid is typically stamped out by a die in a heavy press.

== Safety and health ==
Repeated heating of oil is believed to greatly increase the free radicals in the oil, leading to a higher risk of heart disease.

Injuries, particularly to children, caused by the hot oil from a chip pan falling on them are a common cause of hospital admission in the UK.

=== Fire hazards ===
Chip pans are a common cause of house fires in the United Kingdom, with around 12,000 chip pan fires every year, 1100 of them considered serious, resulting in over 4600 injuries, and 50 deaths per year. British Fire Brigades frequently issue warnings and advice, urging households to switch to a safer means of cooking chips, and advising that, unless it can be easily contained, the fire be left to the emergency services. Several fire brigades have offered a "chip pan amnesty", trading old chip pans for a deep fryer.

Chip pans account for one-fifth of all domestic fires in the Republic of Ireland. After two men died in a 2016 fire in Cork City, a coroner recommended the sale of chip pans be banned and old chip pans be disposed of. Another coroner noted the danger of people heavily inebriated by alcohol putting on a chip pan and falling asleep. In 2015, at a halting site in Carrickmines, eleven people were killed in a chip pan fire, the worst fire in Ireland for 34 years.

==== Prevention ====
Measures to prevent chip fires include:

- Not using chip pans (making oven chips, microwave chips, or frying in a thermostat-controlled electric deep fryer).
- Not using chip pans when feeling unwell, or after having taken alcohol or other drugs.
- Not filling the pan more than 1/3 full; frying food in small amounts.
- Not leaving the pan unattended, even if the phone or doorbell rings.
- Turning the handle to the side so as not to accidentally knock it (but not over another hot ring).
- If the oil or fat starts to smoke, not adding food, turning off the heat immediately, and waiting for it to cool down.
- Drying food before adding it to the oil, including removing any ice.
- Adding a small piece of food to test the temperature; if it crisps quickly, the oil is already hot enough.

Some local fire services will supply free deep fryers. Electric deep fryers feature thermostat-controlled internal heating elements that prevent the oil being heated to the point of ignition.

==== Dealing with a chip pan fire ====
A correct mitigation approach includes:

- Not moving the pan.
- Turning off the heat, if it can be done safely. Leaning over the fire to reach the controls is unsafe.
  - If the cooker is electric, cutting off the power supply will turn off the heat. The power can be cut at the fuse box or breaker box, or at the electricity meter.
- Putting out the fire only if it can be done safely.
  - The best way to accomplish this is to place a lid on the pan.
  - If not possible a class F extinguisher can be used, however care must be taken not to spread the fire outside of the pan. Other extinguisher classes have to be avoided.
  - Adding water must be avoided at all costs, as it leads to violent fire spread.
- If the fire cannot be put out, getting everyone out of the room, closing the door, getting everyone out of the house, and then calling the fire department.

===== Ineffective methods =====
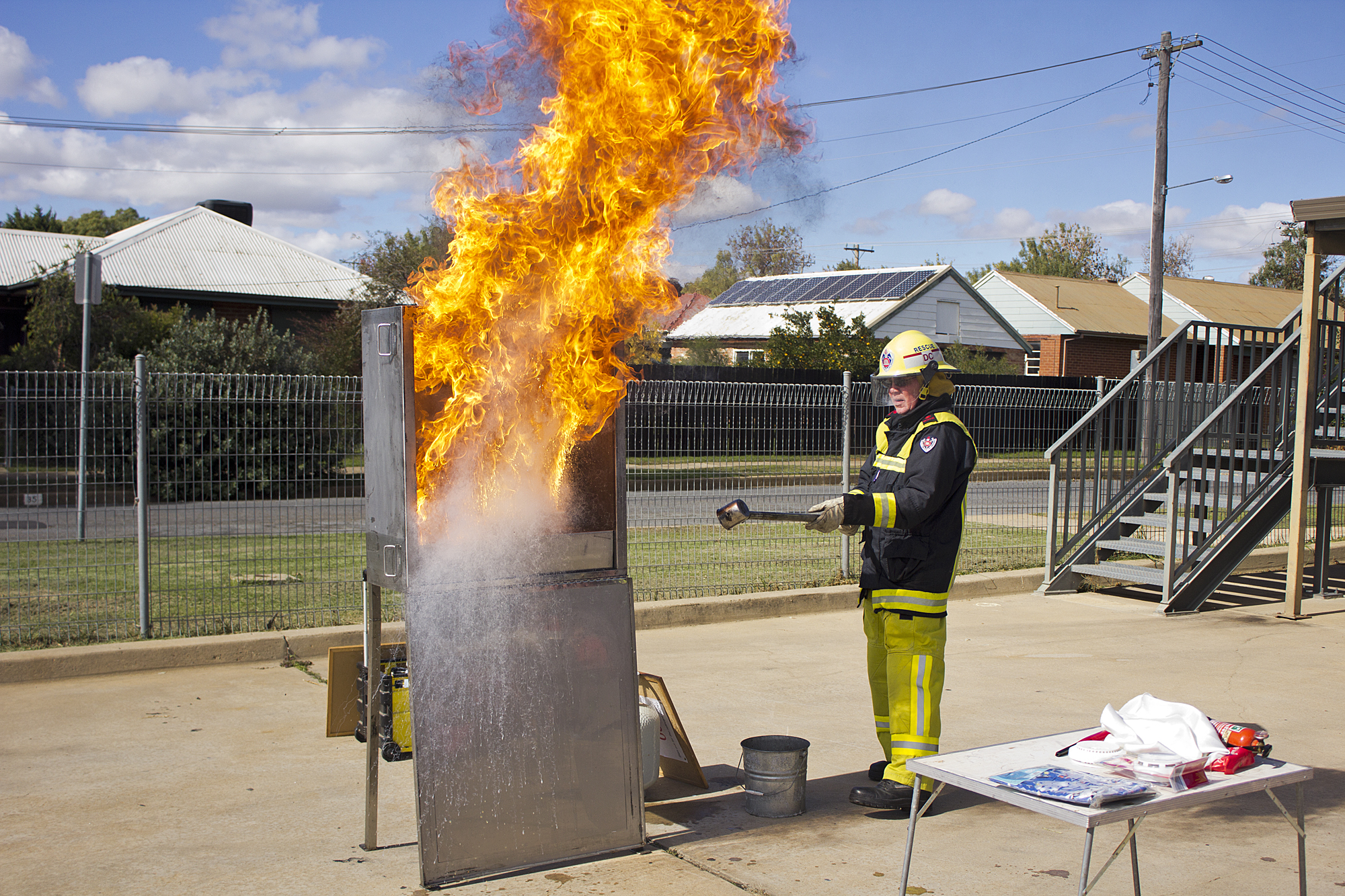
A demonstration of a chip pan fire (125mL, half a cup, of oil) when water is added by Fire and Rescue NSW (video)

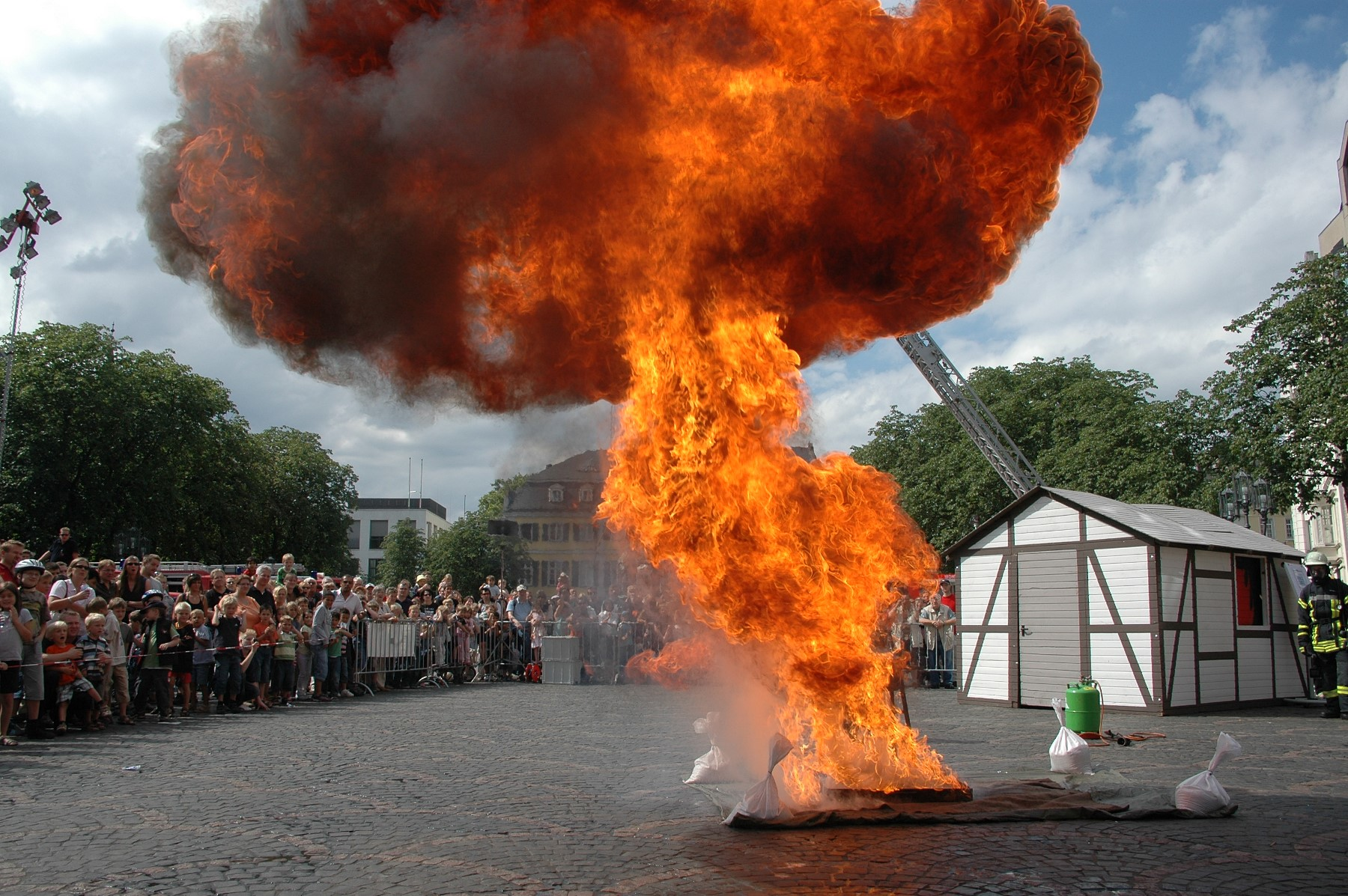
The result of adding 200 ml of water to a liter of burning oil

It is essential not to use water to extinguish a chip pan fire. Attempts to extinguish cooking oil fires with water result in a slopover, an extremely dangerous condition whereby the flaming oil is violently expelled from the container.

Cooking oil fires (Europe class F, US class K) burn hotter than other typical combustible liquids, rendering the standard class A and B fire extinguishers ineffective and even dangerous. Class F fire extinguishers featuring a yellow label use saponification to put out chip pan fires by spraying an alkaline solution which reacts with the fat to make non-flammable soap. These extinguishers are generally only available in industrial and commercial kitchens.

The use of fire blankets has traditionally been considered effective and safe, especially in Europe and Australia. It has, however, been put in question by the Netherlands Food and Consumer Product Safety Authority. The Netherlands Foundation for Burn Wounds reported several accidents involving the use of fire blankets when extinguishing oil/fat fires.

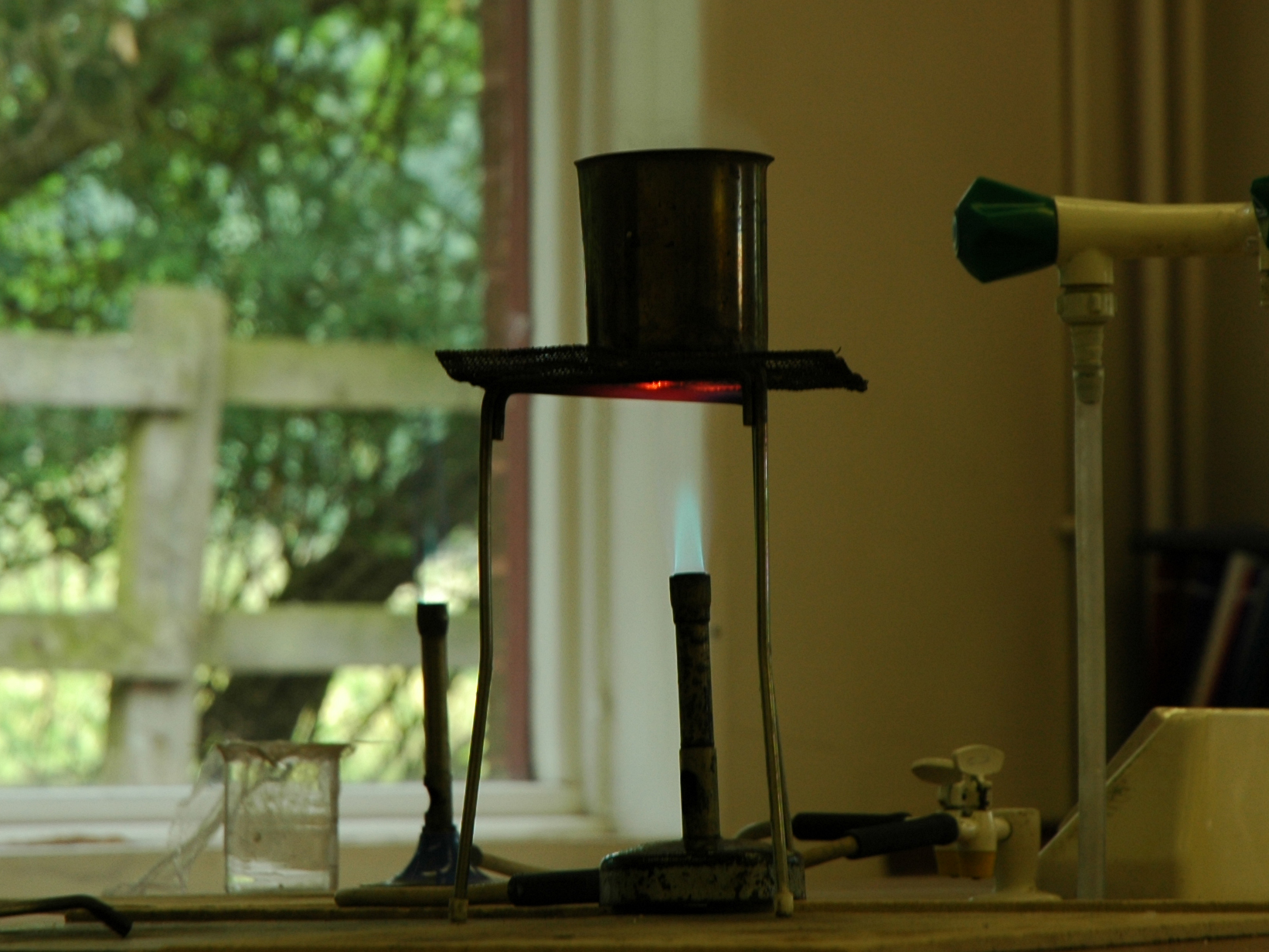
Oil is heated strongly...

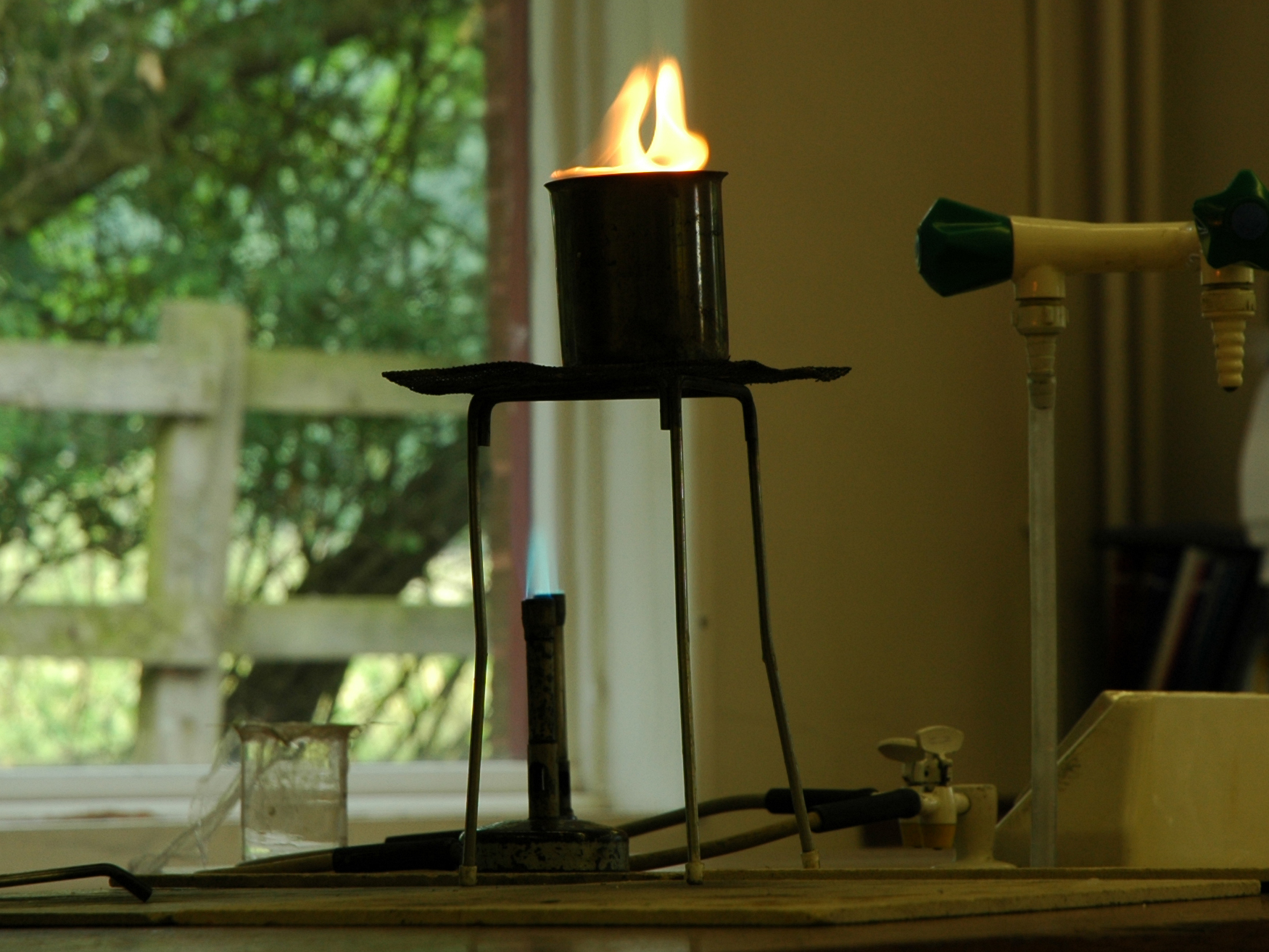
...eventually reaching ignition point.

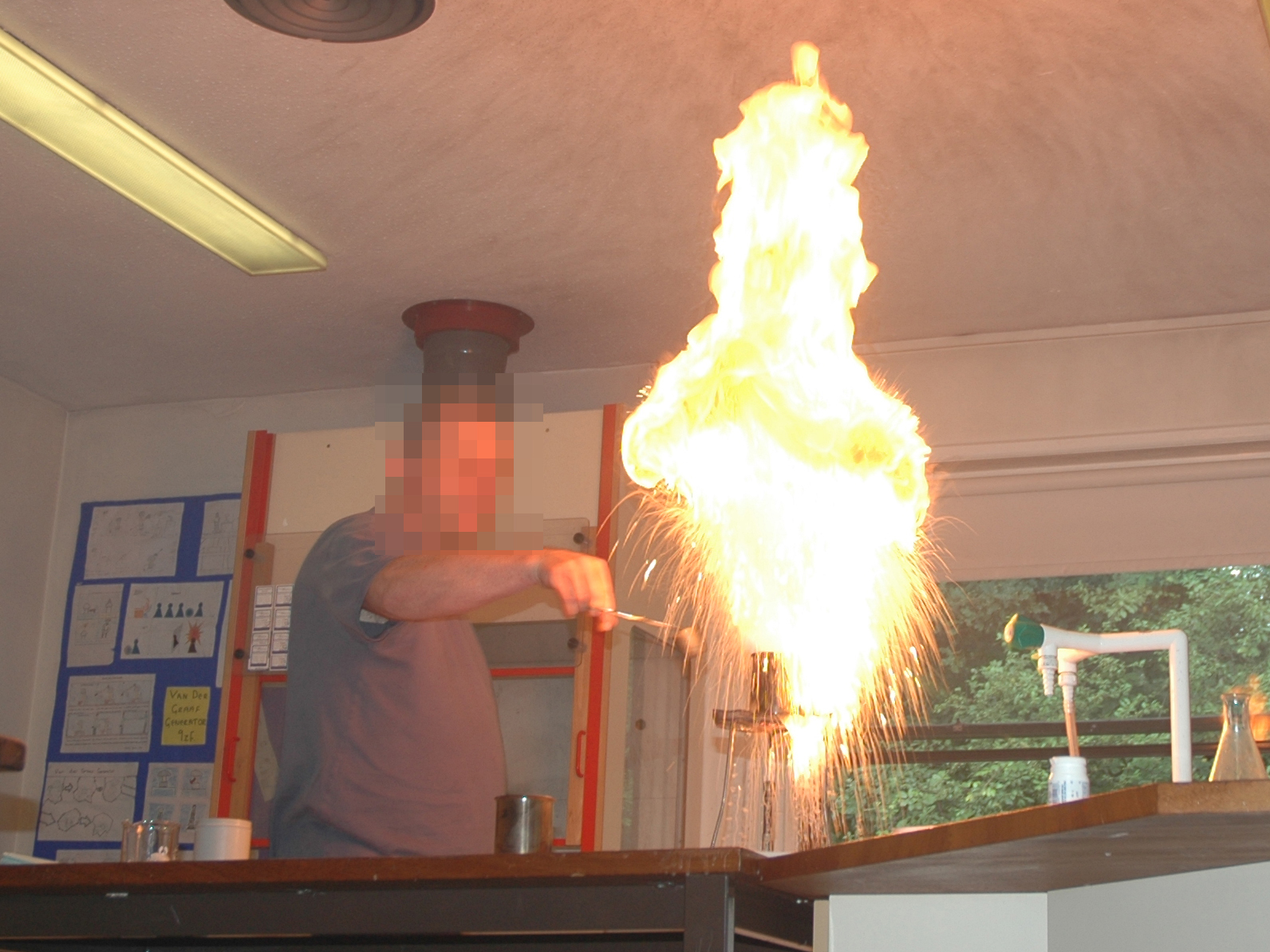
Pouring a very small amount of water into the fire ejects a plume of fire...

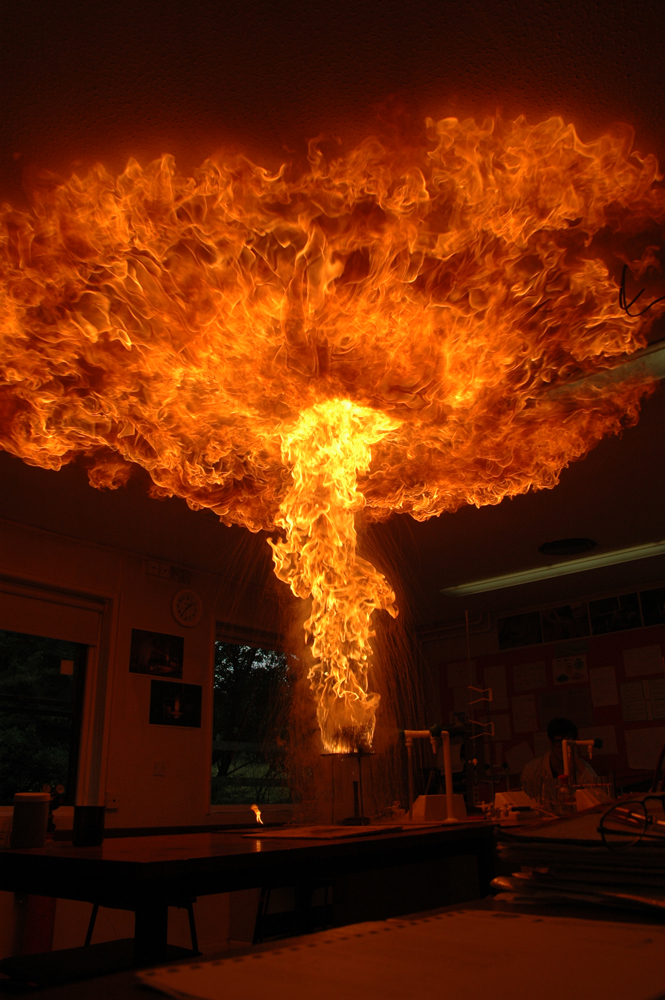
...which rises and spreads against the ceiling.

== See also ==
- List of cooking vessels
