= Pool fire =

Diffusion flame

A pool fire is a type of diffusion flame where a layer of volatile liquid fuel is evaporating and burning. The fuel layer can be either on a horizontal solid substrate or floating on a higher-density liquid, usually water. Pool fires are an important scenario in fire process safety and combustion science, as large amounts of liquid fuels are stored and transported by different industries.

== Physical properties ==
The most important physical parameter describing a pool fire is the heat release rate, which determines the minimum safe distance needed to avoid burns from thermal radiation. The heat release rate is limited by the rate of evaporation of the fuel, as the combustion reaction takes place in the gas phase. The evaporation rate, in turn, is determined by other physical parameters, such as the depth, surface area and shape of the pool, as well as the fuel boiling point, heat of vaporization, heat of combustion, thermal conductivity and others. A feedback loop exists between the heat release rate and evaporation rate, as a significant part of the energy released in the combustion reaction will be transmitted from the gas phase to the liquid fuel, and can supply the needed heat of vaporization. In the case of large pool fires, most of the heat transfer happens in the form of thermal radiation.

Typical fuels in accidental pool fires, or experiments simulating them, include aliphatic hydrocarbons (n-heptane, liquefied propane gas), aromatic hydrocarbons (toluene, xylene), alcohols (methanol, ethanol) or mixtures thereof (kerosene). It is important that a pool fire involving a water-insoluble fuel is not attempted to be extinguished with water, as this can trigger explosive boiling and spattering of the burning material.

Open-top tank fires are pool fires of industrial scale that occur when the roof of an atmospheric tank fails due to internal tank blast, followed by the contents of the tank catching fire. If a layer of water is present underneath the fuel and the fuel is a mixture of chemical species with several different boiling points, a boilover may eventually occur, greatly aggravating the fire. The boilover onset occurs as soon as a hot zone propagates down through the fuel, reaching the water and making it boil.

== See also ==
- Radiative transfer
- Fire safety
