= Boilover =

Expulsion of blazing liquid due to water boiling underneath

A boilover (or boil-over) is an extremely hazardous phenomenon in which a layer of water under a pool fire (e.g., an open-top tank fire) starts boiling, which results in a significant increase in fire intensity accompanied by violent expulsion of burning fluid to the surrounding areas. Boilover can only occur if the liquid fluid is a mixture of different chemical species with sufficiently diverse boiling points, although a so-called thin-layer boilover – a far less hazardous phenomenon – can arise from any water-immiscible liquid fuel. Crude oil, kerosene and some diesel oils are examples of fuels giving rise to boilover.

Boilovers at industrial scale are rare but can lead to serious plant damage. Given the sudden and not easily predictable onset of the phenomenon, fatalities can occur, especially among firefighters and bystanders that have not been made to leave the area.

Slopover and frothover are phenomena similar to boilover but distinct from it. A slopover occurs when pouring water over a liquid pool fire, which may result in sudden expulsion of blazing fluid as well as considerable flame growth if the fire is small, as is the case when dousing water over a chip pan fire. A frothover is a situation occurring when there is a layer of water under a layer of a viscous fuel that, although not on fire, is at higher temperature than the boiling point of water.

== Features ==
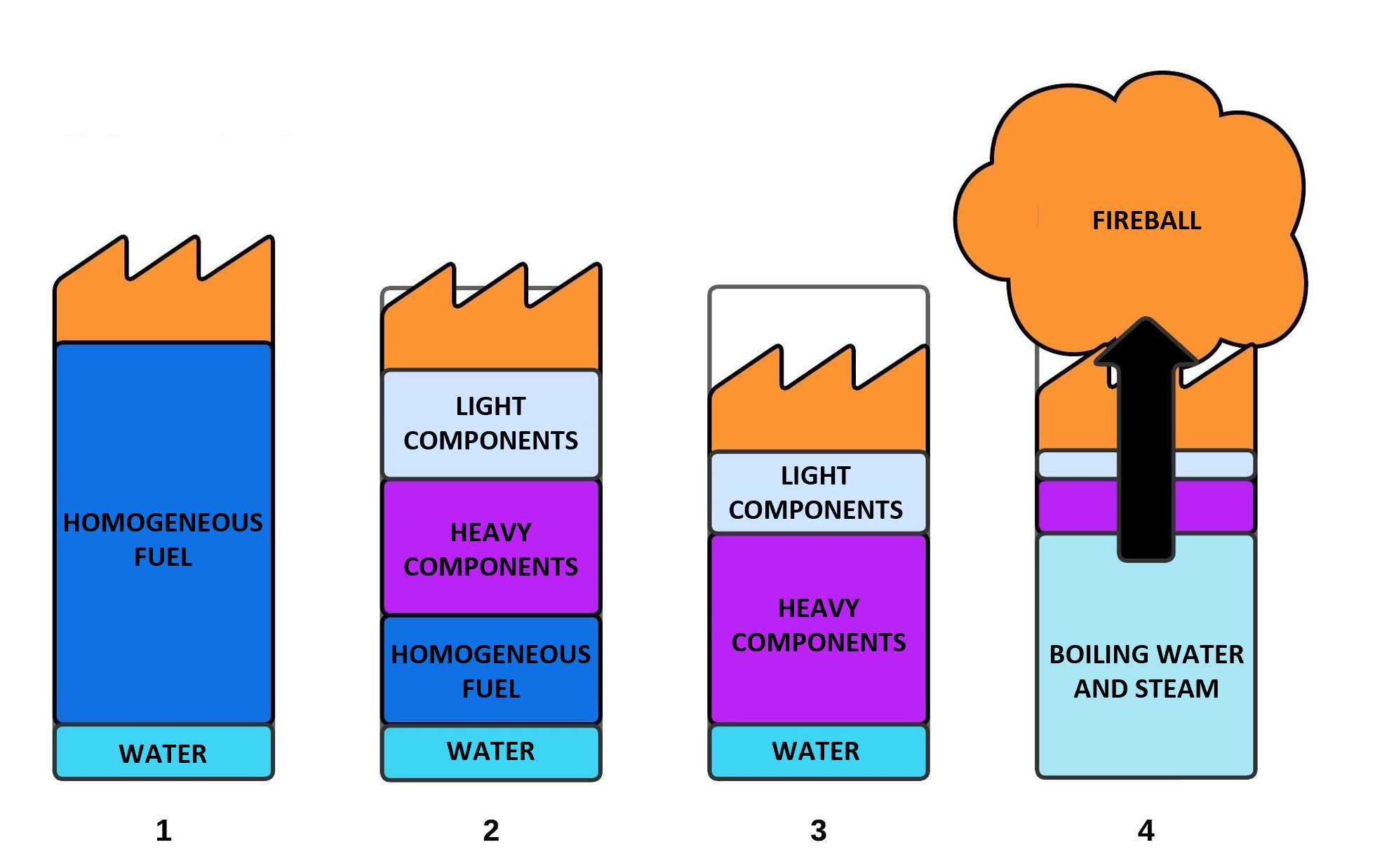
Boilover onset mechanism

The extreme violence of boilovers is due to the expansion of water from liquid to steam, which is by a factor of 1500 or more. In practical storage scenarios, the presence of water under the burning fluid is sometimes due to spurious accumulation during plant operation (e.g., rainwater entering a seam in the tank roof, off-specification products from the source, residual water from an oil reservoir, or humidity condensation) or as a consequence of attempts to extinguish the fire with water. A typical scenario for a tank fire that may eventually result in boilover is an initial confined explosion blowing off the tank roof.

Pure chemical species are not liable to boilover. In order for one to occur, the material must be a mixture of species with sufficiently diverse boiling points. Crude oil and some commercial hydrocarbon mixtures, such as kerosene and some diesel oils, are examples of such materials. The fact that these are stored in large atmospheric tanks in refineries, tank farms, power stations, etc. makes boilover a hazard of interest in terms of process safety. During a pool fire, a distillation process takes place in the fuel. Separation of light components from heavier ones occurs thanks to convective fluid motion. An intermediate fuel layer, called the hot zone or heat wave, is formed, which becomes progressively richer in higher-boiling-point species. Its temperature, as well as thickness, progressively increase. Its lower boundary moves downwards towards the fuel–water interface at a speed higher than the overall level of fuel decreases due to the fire burning it. As a result, when the hot zone reaches the water layer, a considerable amount of unburnt fuel may still be present above the water. Upon the water contacting the hot zone, some steam forms. The resulting turbulence promotes mixing of the water into the hot fuel. This can result in rapid water vaporization. The violent expansion of the steam bubbles will push out a significant part of the fuel above it, causing a violent overflow of flaming liquid. In these conditions water may be superheated, in which case part of it goes through an explosive boiling with homogeneous nucleation of steam. When this happens, the abruptness of the expansion further enhances the expulsion of blazing fuel. Typical hot-zone speeds are 0.3–0.5 meters per hour (1.0–1.7 ft/h), although speeds of up to 1.2 meters per hour (4.0 ft/h) have been recorded.

Apart from the presence of a water layer under the fuel, other conditions must be met for a hot-zone boilover to occur:

- Since the upper fuel layers, including the hot zone, are at or near their boiling temperature, it is necessary for the boiling point of the fuel to be high enough, such that the hot zone temperature is higher than the water boiling temperature. Both the effect of the static head of fuel above the water and the fact that the hot zone composition is different from that of the initial fuel have to be considered. In general, boilover is possible if the fuel mean boiling point (calculated as a geometric mean of its lower and upper boiling points, i.e. the temperatures at which the mixture, respectively, starts to boil and is completely vaporized) is higher than 120 °C (248 °F):
  $${\bar{T}}_{\text{boil}}={{({T}_{\text{boil,min}}\ {T}_{\text{boil,max}})}^{0.5}}>{\text{120 °C}}$$
- As mentioned above, the composition of the fuel mixture must be sufficiently varied. It has been observed that the gap between T_{boil,max} and the higher value between T_{boil,min} and the boiling point of water at the fuel–water interface has to be higher than 60 °C (108 °F):
  $${{T}_{\text{boil,max}}-\max{({T}_{\text{boil,min}},{{T}_{\text{boil,water}}})}}>{\text{60 °C}}$$
  Some sources indicate that the upper range of the boiling temperature has to be above 149 °C (300 °F):
  $${{T}_{\text{boil,max}}}>{\text{149 °C}}$$
- The fuel viscosity must be sufficiently high to oppose the upwards movement of the steam bubbles. Otherwise, these may flow through the fuel without projecting it out of the blazing tank. Low viscosity may also make it difficult for a stable heavy-components hot zone to form, thanks to more efficient natural convection. Thus, experiments on gasoline (dynamic viscosity ≈ 0.37 cSt) pool fires have shown that boilover does not occur. In general, fuel dynamic viscosity has to be higher at least 0.73 cSt, which is the viscosity of kerosene.

The hazards posed by a hot-zone boilover are significant for several reasons. At industrial scale, hydrocarbon tanks can contain up to hundreds of thousands of barrels of fluid. If a boilover occurs, the amount of blazing liquid erupting from the tank can therefore be huge. Ejected blazing fluids can travel at speeds up to 32 kilometres per hour (20 mph) and attain distances well in excess of the limits of secondary containment bunding, often hundreds of meters or in the order of ten tank diameters downwind. Bunding, however, remains an important measure to reduce fire spread. Moreover, since boilover inception is sometimes unpredictable —either in terms of time to onset or whether it will occur at all (because the presence of water in the tank bottom may not be a known factor)— the impact on the firefighters that have intervened to control the fire can be deadly. In some cases, simple bystanders were caught in the blaze and perished.

Tank fires that appear to be relatively stable may burst into massive boilovers several hours after the fire starts, as it occurred in the Tacoa disaster. Failure to appreciate the hazards posed by a water layer underneath the fuel has been a significant contributing cause to the aftermath of boilover accidents, in terms of human and material losses. Uncertainty surrounding the time to boilover onset adds unpredictability that further complicates the efforts of the firefighting services. Mathematical models for boilover have been developed that predict the time necessary for boilover to initiate, among other things.

== Notable accidents ==
The following are some notable accidents in which a standard, or hot-zone, boilover occurred:

- 20 January 1968, Shell refinery, Pernis, The Netherlands – Water emulsion and hot crude oil mixed and produced frothing, vapor release and boilover. The fire spread thirty acres (120,000 m^{2}), destroying several refinery units and 80 tanks.
- 26 June 1971, Czechowice-Dziedzice oil refinery, Poland – A 33-meter (108 ft)-diameter crude oil tank was hit by lightning, which caused a roof collapse and an open-top tank fire. After extended firefighting and a decrease in the fire intensity, boilover occurred, spewing flaming liquids up to 250 meters (820 ft) away. A nearby tank exploded due to ignition of flammable vapors inside. Thirty-three people died.
- 19 December 1982, Ricardo Zuloaga thermal power plant in Tacoa, Vargas, Venezuela – In the Tacoa disaster more than 150 people, including journalists and bystanders not involved in fighting the fire, died when a massive boilover developed from a fuel oil tank. It is the worst tank fire ever occurred worldwide.
- 30 August 1983, Amoco oil refinery, Milford Haven, Wales – An open-top tank fire occurred at a crude storage tank. Filled with more than 46,000 tons of oil, the flaming storage tank experienced multiple boilovers, spreading the fire into the four-acre (16,000 m^{2}) containment dyke. However, the fire did not propagate further. In all, 150 firefighters and 120 fire appliances were needed to tackle the blaze. While six firefighters were injured during the two-day fire, no one was killed.

== Related phenomena ==
=== Thin-layer boilover ===
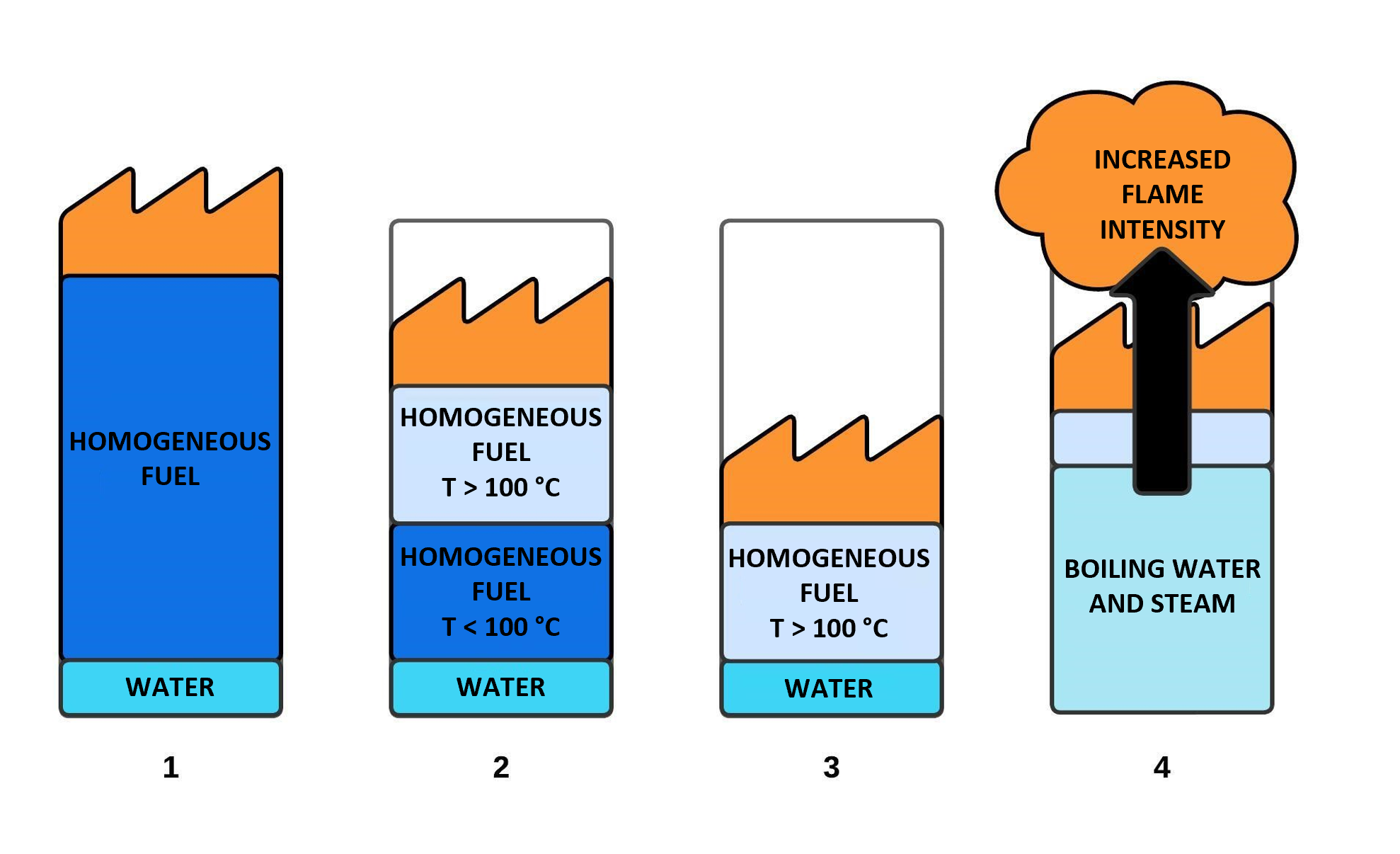
Thin-layer boilover onset mechanism

A thin-layer boilover (Note: Where the fuel layer is thick and distillation does occur, the phenomenon may be referred to as standard, hot-zone or classic boilover, to avoid confusion with thin-layer boilover.) occurs in one of two situations:

- When the fuel layer is thin, such as in the case of spillage on a wet surface. In this case the boilover onset time is very short, typically about one minute.
- When, regardless of the thickness of the fuel layer, distillation does not occur and a heat wave is not formed. In such a situation, for a boilover to occur, the fuel has to burn down until its warmer top layer reaches the fuel–water interface.

In a thin-layer boilover, the size of the flames increases upon boilover onset, and a characteristic crackling sound is produced. However, due to the little amount of fuel left, this phenomenon is far less hazardous than a standard boilover. The study of thin-layer boilover is of interest in the context of in-situ burning of oil spills over water.

=== Slopover ===
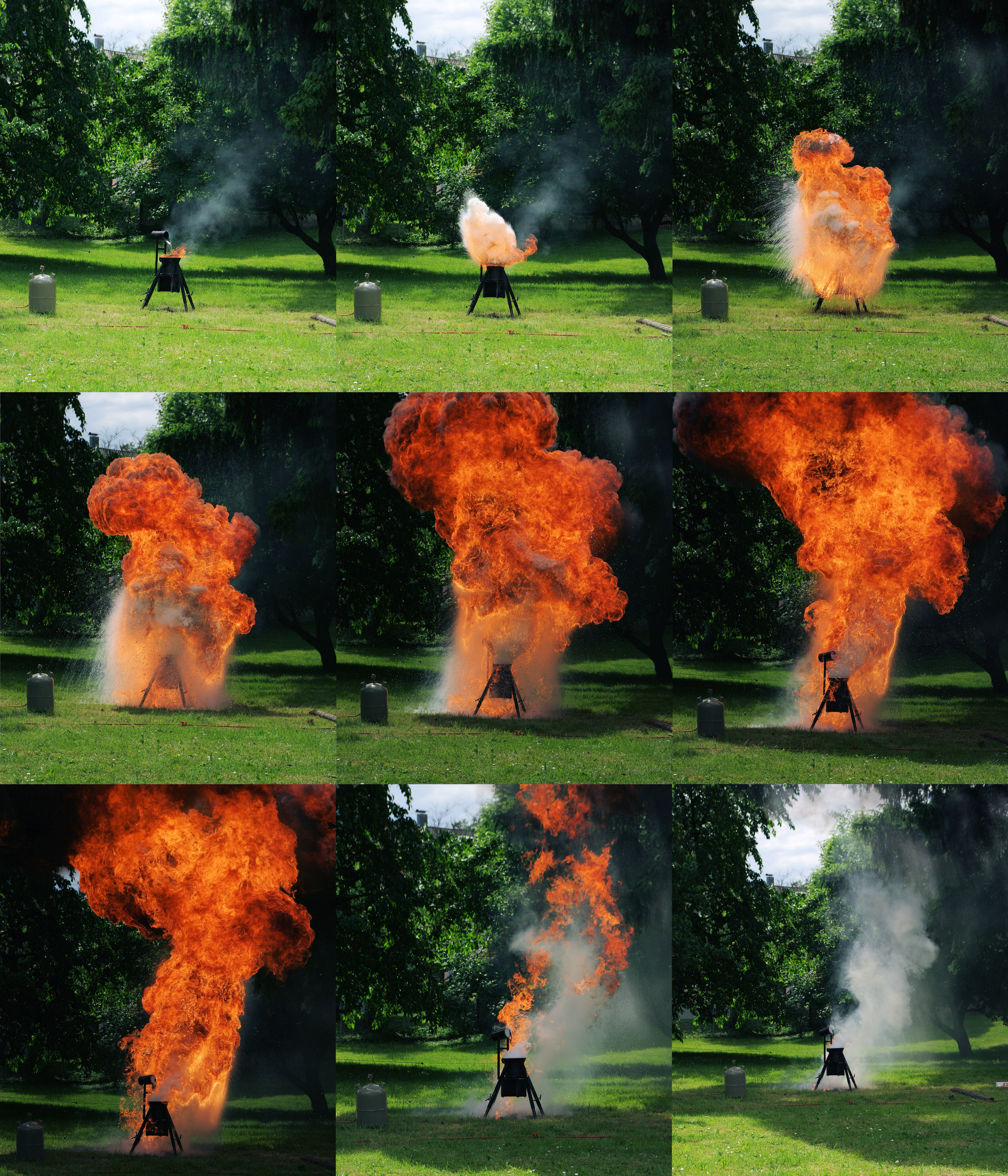
Firefighters demonstrating slopover. Length of the sequence: 2.4 seconds. 1 kg of cooking oil and 1 liter of water.

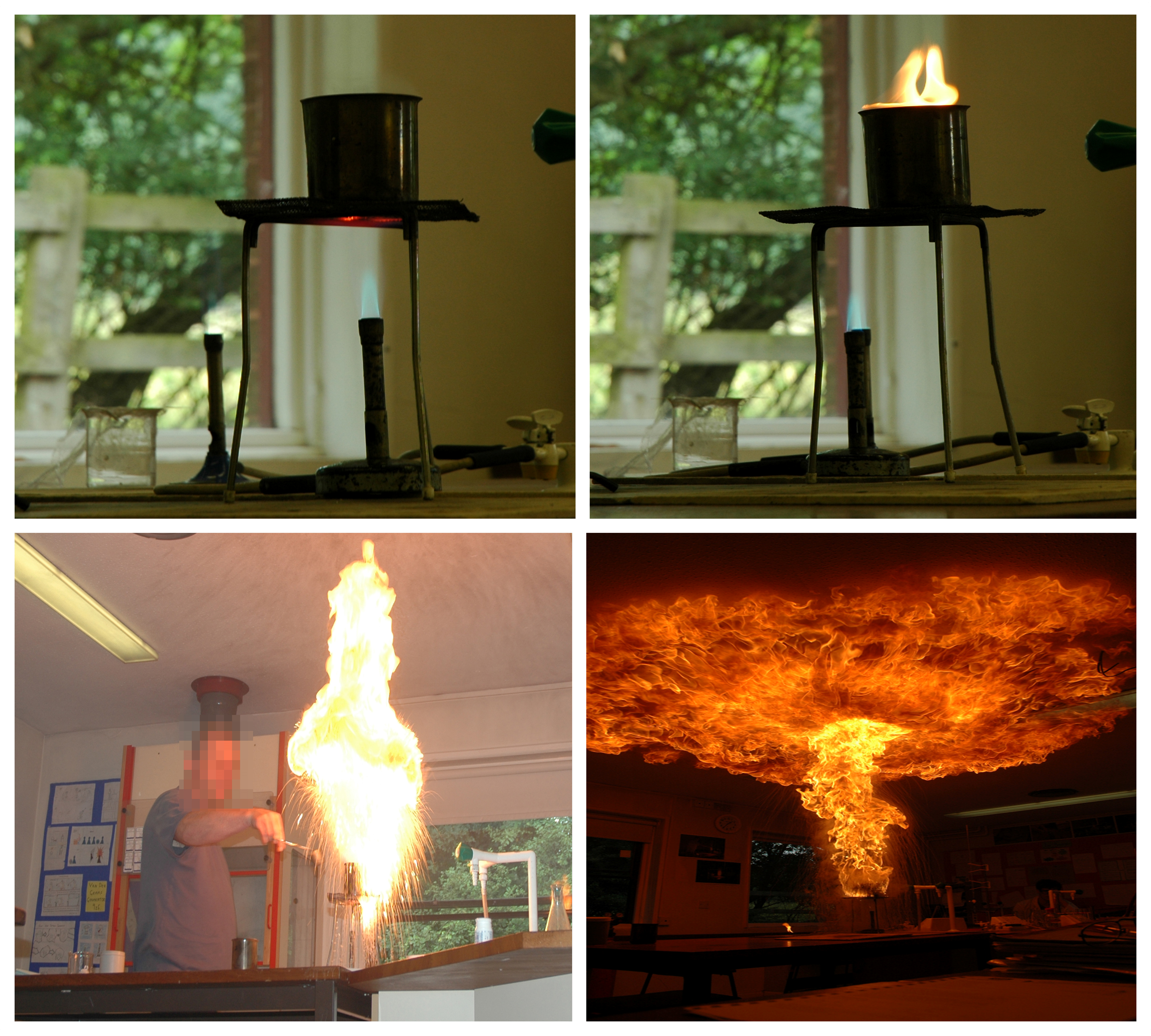
A demonstration of chip pan fire slopover: Oil is heated and ignites, a small amount of water is poured on the fire and a violent plume of flames rises to the room ceiling.

A slopover is a phenomenon similar to boilover, although distinct from it. It occurs when water is poured onto the fuel while a pool fire is occurring. If the fire is small enough, the water that instantly boils in contact with the fire or with the lower layers of blazing liquid (which are themselves not on fire but may be hotter than the water boiling point) can extend the flames, especially in the upwards direction.

In industrial-scale tank fires, there is no noticeable effect when water is doused on the fire, although water sinking to the bottom of the tank may contribute to a later boilover. However, at smaller scale, slopovers pose significant hazards. Trying to extinguish a chip pan or cooking oil fire with water, for example, causes slopover, which can harm people and spread the fire in the kitchen. Serious burn incidents have also occurred during Mid-autumn Festival celebrations, where boiling candlewax and pouring water on it for entertainment has become a habit.

=== Frothover ===
A frothover occurs when a water layer is present under a layer of a viscous oil that is not on fire and whose temperature is higher than the water boiling point. An example is hot asphalt loaded into a tank car containing some water. Although nothing may happen at first, water may eventually superheat and later start to boil violently, resulting in overflow.

== Fire protection ==
Water is generally unsuitable for extinguishing liquid fires. In the context of boilovers and slopovers, the fuel is generally lighter than water. At industrial scale, this means that water applied to an open-top tank fire will sink to the bottom of the tank, which can cause boilover at a later stage. At small/domestic scale, assuming the water can find its way down through the fuel, use of water may cause the content of the vessel to spill over and spread the fire. If water does not sink efficiently to the bottom, then a violent slopover may occur. This makes water both inefficient as an extinguishing agent and potentially very hazardous.

=== Industrial-scale storage sites ===
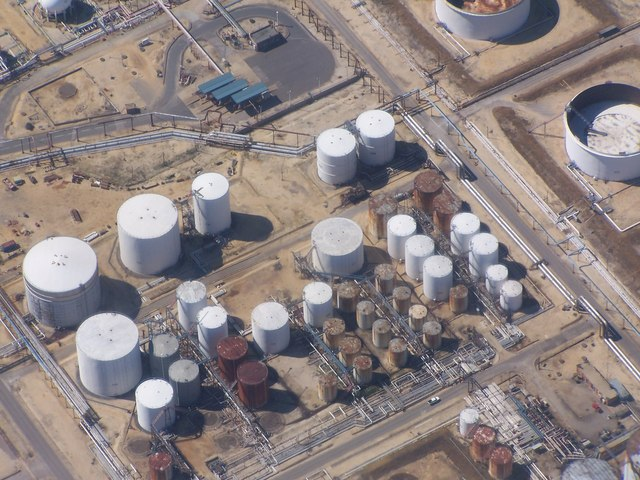
Tanks in a refinery

Hot-zone boilovers of large tanks are relatively rare events. However, they can be extremely disruptive. Therefore, prevention and control are very important.

Boilover can be prevented by regularly checking for and draining water in the tank bottoms.

In terms of plant layout, intertank distances would have to exceed five tank diameters in order to prevent escalation to adjacent tanks. In most cases, it is not feasible to design for such an arrangement.

Open-top crude oil tank fires can be tackled using firefighting foam or vapor suppression beads at rates of 10–12 L/(min × m^{2}). However, it is not clear if these rates are adequate to minimize the potential for a boilover event, especially in cases where foam attack is initiated long after the inception of the tank fire. It has been suggested that foam firefighting should be started within 2–4 hours from ignition.

Thermal radiation during a boilover is considerably higher than during the pool fire that precedes it. Although the event is short-lived, emergency response activities, for which tenable levels of thermal radiations are typically 6.3 kW/m^{2}, cannot be safely accomplished, so operations should take place from a safe distance.

Some approaches are available to assess the probability of and the proximity to boilover in tank fires. An estimation can be made a priori from the distillation curve and the properties of the fuel, with the aid of mathematical formulas, including the ones given above. However, this approach requires knowledge of the depth of the water layer at the bottom of the tank. Further, it does not consider the potential for a layer of water–fuel emulsion being present above the water. Progression of the hot zone can be monitored by using vertical strips of intumescent paint applied to the tank walls, or applying a water jet to the walls to assess at what height it starts boiling. Use of thermographic cameras or pyrometers has also been proposed. However, uncertainty regarding the presence and depth of a water or a water–fuel emulsion layer remains, and unpredictability about boilover onset cannot be completely dispelled. Draining the product from the tank may reduce accidental consequences, because less fluid would be subject to boilover. However, pumping out product may also reduce the time to boilover onset.

== See also ==
- Phreatic eruption, a similar concept in volcanic eruption.
