= Fire classification =

System of categorizing fire

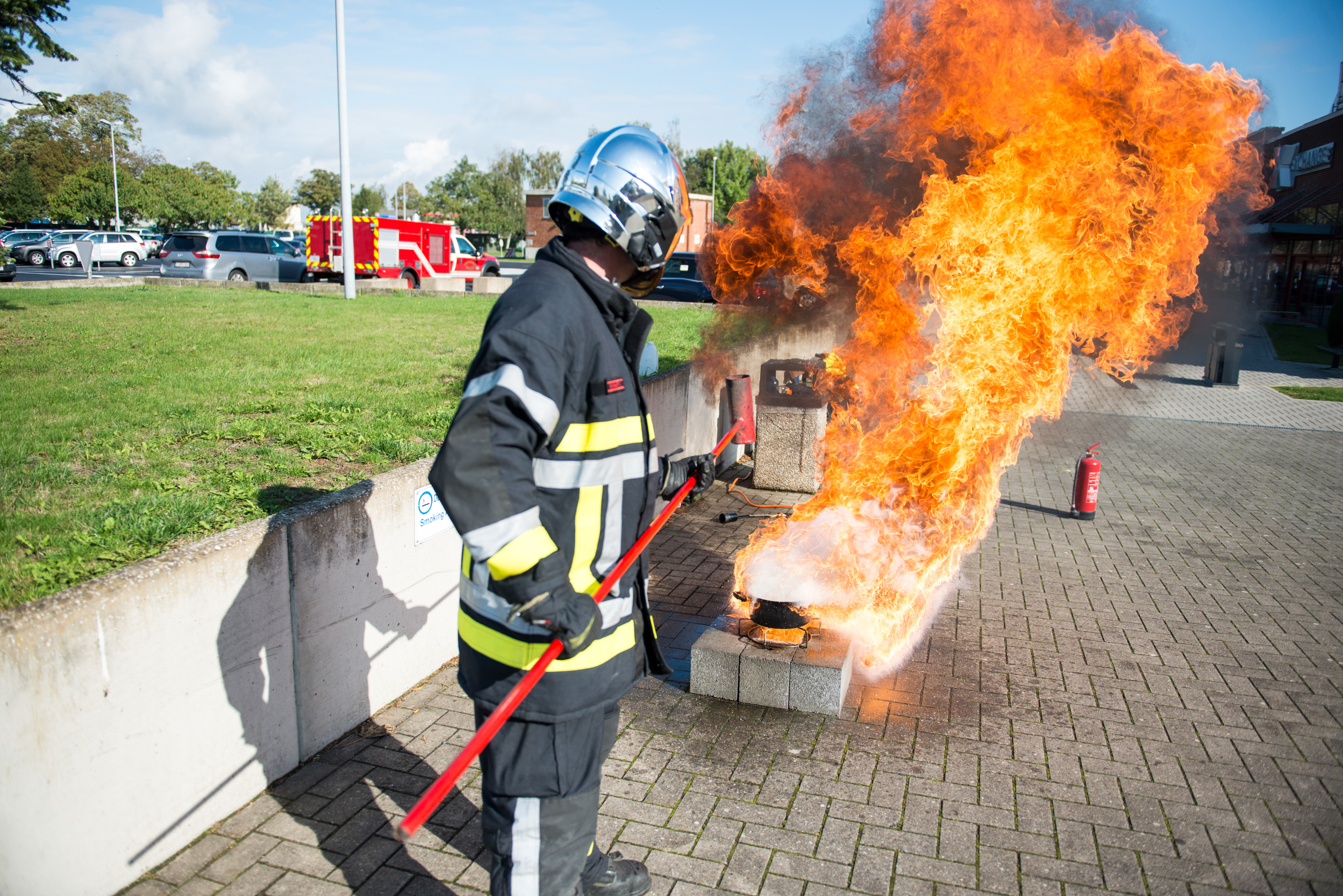
Demonstration of using the wrong suppressant on a grease fire

Fire classification is a system of categorizing fires with regard to the type(s) of combustible material(s) involved, and the form(s) of suitable extinguishing agent(s). Classes are often assigned letter designations, which can differ between territories that utilise different standards. Classes are typically applied in a residential, commercial or industrial context outside of unplanned and uncontrolled vegetation fires, which typically don't fall into this type of classification and often involve different methods of suppression.

== Standardised classification of fires by region ==
As fire research has evolved over time, several standards of fire classification have emerged based on need and jurisdictional considerations. These standards are largely similar, though have evolved with different but important nuances as advancements in technology have challenged fire scientists and firefighters.

Type of combustible material	Class				
Type of combustible material	International ISO 3941:2026	Australia and New Zealand AS/NZS 1850:2009 (Note: This jurisdiction combines classifications of fire with fire extinguisher types in the same standard.)	European Union EN 2:2005	United Kingdom BS ISO 3941:2026	United States NFPA 10
Flammable solids	A	A	A	A	A
Flammable liquids, excluding cooking fats and oils	B	B	B	B	B
Flammable gases	C	C	C	C	B
Combustible metals	D	D	D	D	D
Electrical fires (Note: Electricity itself does not burn but can ignite and sustain a fire by arcing through and igniting flammable materials if the source of electricity cannot be safely isolated. Electricity is considered a dangerous and potentially deadly complication to a fire that involves live electrical circuits, or batteries that store electrical charge. In recognition of the hazards posed by electricity some standards recognise electricity as a separate and supplementary class of fire, such as Australia, to ensure that the correct and safe type of extinguisher is selected commensurate to the hazards it was selected for, and subsequently used to knock down and extinguish a fire. In regions that make the distinction, Class E (electrical) fires that are safely disconnected from all energised sources change to the fire class (or classes) of the material continuing to burn.)	Not classified	(E) (Note: Bracketed 'E' denotes extinguisher is appropriate for fires involving live electrical circuits, and usually accompanies another class of fire, such as AB(E) or B(E).)	No longer classified (Note: Originally "Class E", but is no longer classified as a fire type involving combustible material.)	Not classified	C
Grease fires (cooking fats and oils)	F	F	F	F	K
Lithium-ion cells and batteries	L	Not classified	L	L	Not classified

== Materials and hazards ==
=== Flammable solids ===
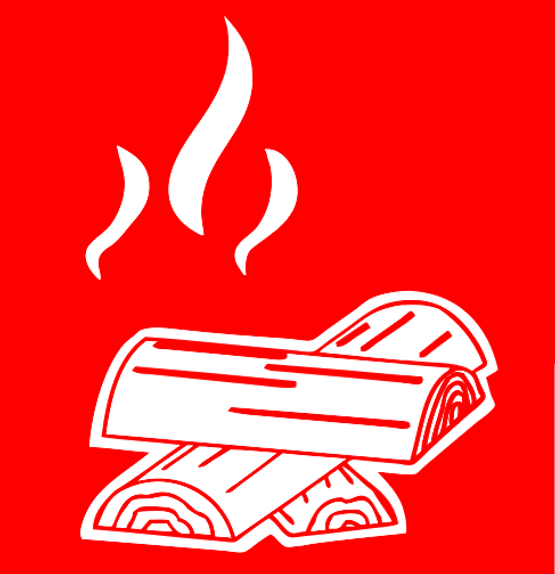

Fires involving ordinary flammable solids fall under Class A. This includes wood, paper, fabric, rubber, and some types of plastics. Such fires may be extinguished by water, wet chemical suppression, or dry chemical powder.

=== Flammable liquids ===
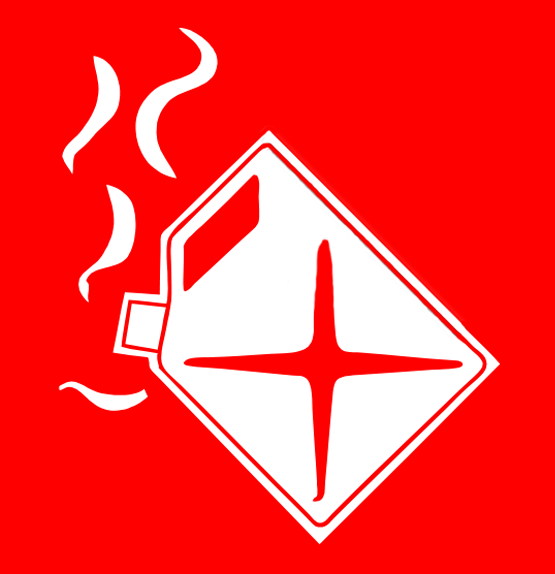

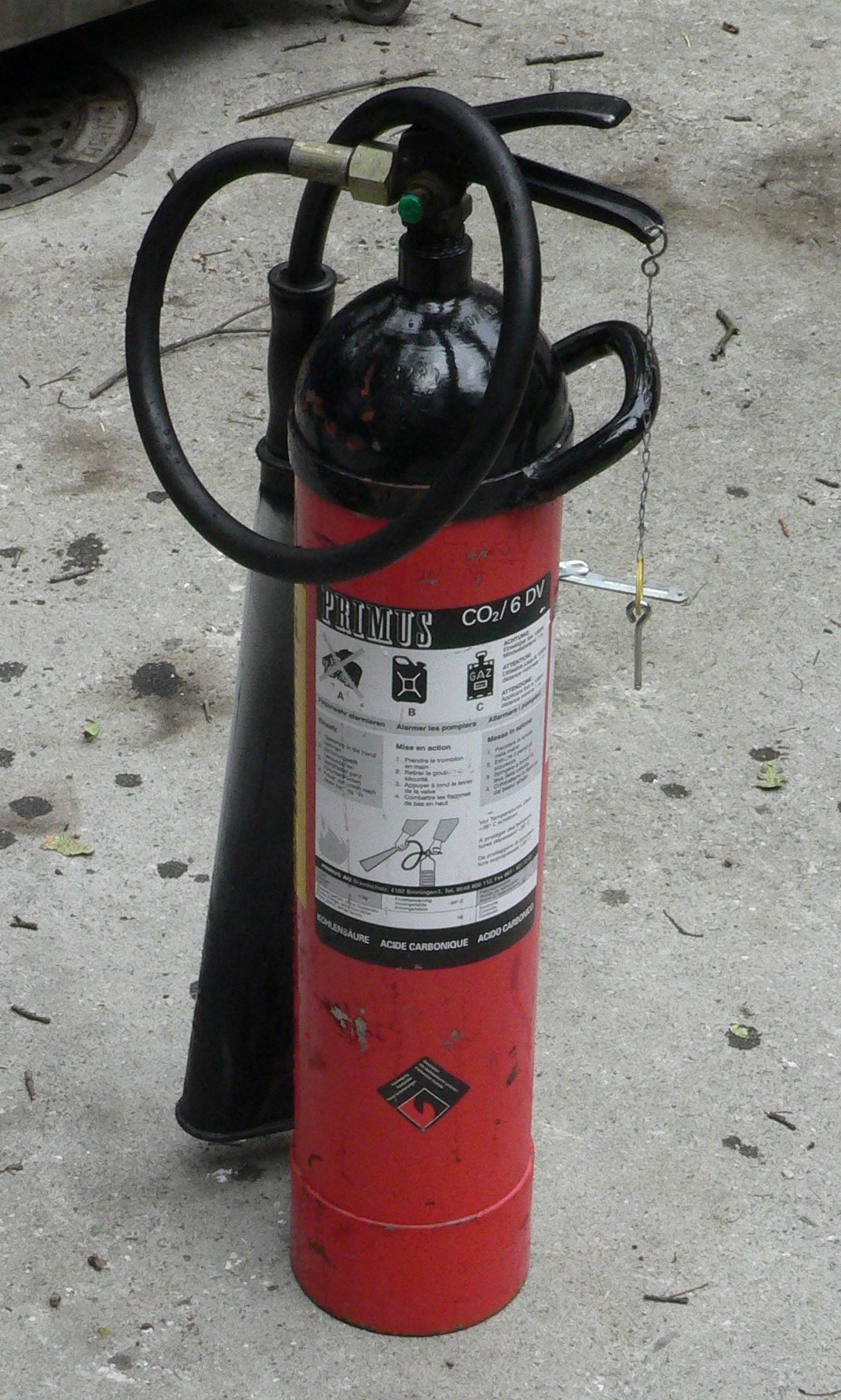
A carbon dioxide fire extinguisher rated for flammable liquids and gases

Fires involving flammable liquids or liquefiable solids fall under Class B (Note: Under the European and Australian systems, flammable liquids designated Class B require flash points no more than 93 °C (199 °F).). Examples may include petrol/gasoline, oil, paint, some waxes & plastics, though cooking fats and oils are explicitly excluded (discussed and categorised separately below).

A solid stream of water should never be used to extinguish this type of fire because it can cause the fuel to scatter, spreading the flames. The most effective way to extinguish a liquid fire is by inhibiting the chemical chain reaction of the fire, which can be done by dry chemical or Halon extinguishing agents. Smothering with CO_{2} or foam is also effective. Halon has fallen out of favor in recent times (except for aircraft fire extinguishing systems) because it is an ozone-depleting material (the Montreal Protocol declares that Halon should no longer be used). Chemicals such as FM-200 are now the recommended halogenated suppressant.

=== Flammable gases ===
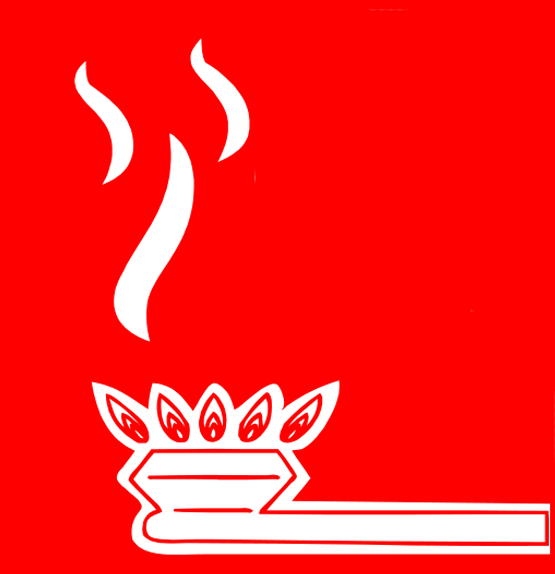

Fires involving flammable gases fall under Class C in the European/Australian system, and Class B (along with flammable liquids) in the US system. This can include natural gas, hydrogen, propane, and butane.

Due to the nature of the fuel, these fires can be difficult to extinguish. The most effective techniques for the control of a flammable gas fire are to stop the flow of fuel (by turning off any gas taps or valves) or to displace the supply of oxygen. Control of fires involving flammable gases where the gas source cannot be controlled must be carefully managed. If the flames are extinguished, but the gas continues to leak, an explosive atmosphere may be created, and the gas may find a source for reignition outside of the originally affected area. Strategies employed to manage these fires may include trying to direct or contain the fire to prevent the ignition of other fuels whilst work is done to control the fuel supply.

=== Combustible metals ===
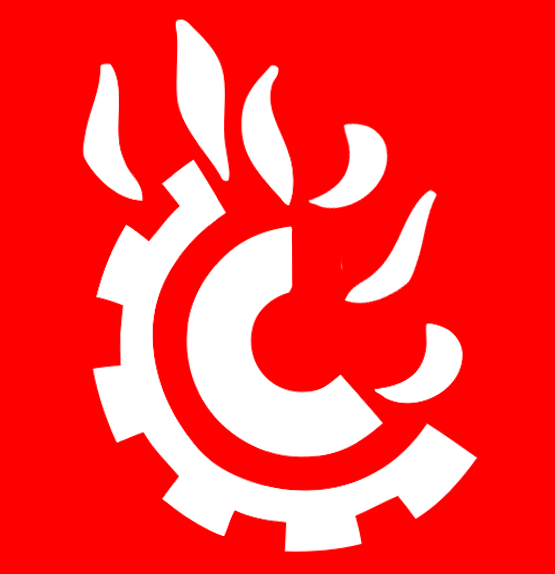

Fires involving combustible metals fall under Class D. This especially concerns alkali metals like lithium, potassium and sodium, alkaline earth metals such as magnesium, and group 4 elements such as titanium and zirconium.

Metal fires represent a unique hazard because people are often unaware of the characteristics of these fires and are not properly prepared to fight them. It is also not always clear what type of metal is burning. Certain metals catch fire in contact with air or water (for example, sodium), which exacerbates this risk. Monolithic masses of combustible metals do not usually represent great fire risks because heat is conducted away from hot spots so efficiently that the heat of combustion cannot be maintained. In consequence, significant heat energy is required to ignite a contiguous mass of combustible metal. Generally, metal fires are a hazard when the metal is in the form of swarf which combusts more rapidly than larger blocks due to the increased surface-area-to-volume ratio. Metal fires can be ignited by the same ignition sources that would start other common fires.

Special care must be taken when extinguishing metal fires. Water and other common firefighting agents can exacerbate them. The National Fire Protection Association recommends that metal fires be fought with dry powder extinguishing agents that work by smothering and heat absorption. Different metals require different extinguishing agents and for a particular metal, agents cannot necessarily be substituted for one another. The most common agents are sodium chloride granules and graphite powder. In recent years, powdered copper has also come into use. These dry powder extinguishers should not be confused with those that contain dry chemical agents. The two are not the same, and only dry powder should be used to extinguish a metal fire. Using a dry chemical extinguisher in error, in place of dry powder, can be ineffective or actually increase the intensity of a metal fire. Lacking a specialist extinguisher, sand may in some cases provide a sufficient alternative, though notably sand may contain moisture which could result in a rapid, hazardous release of steam.

=== Electrical fires ===
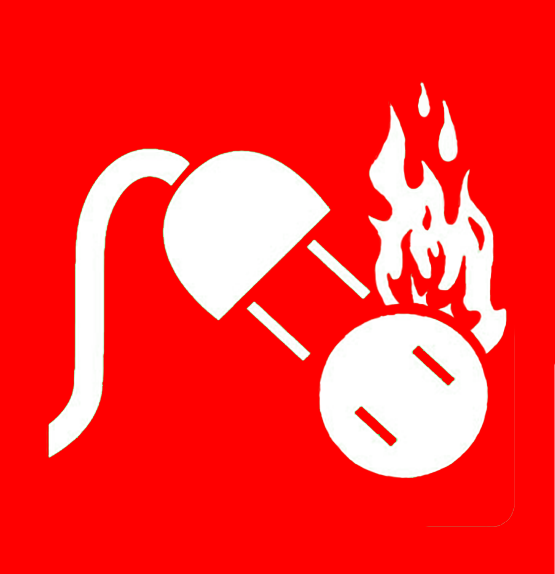

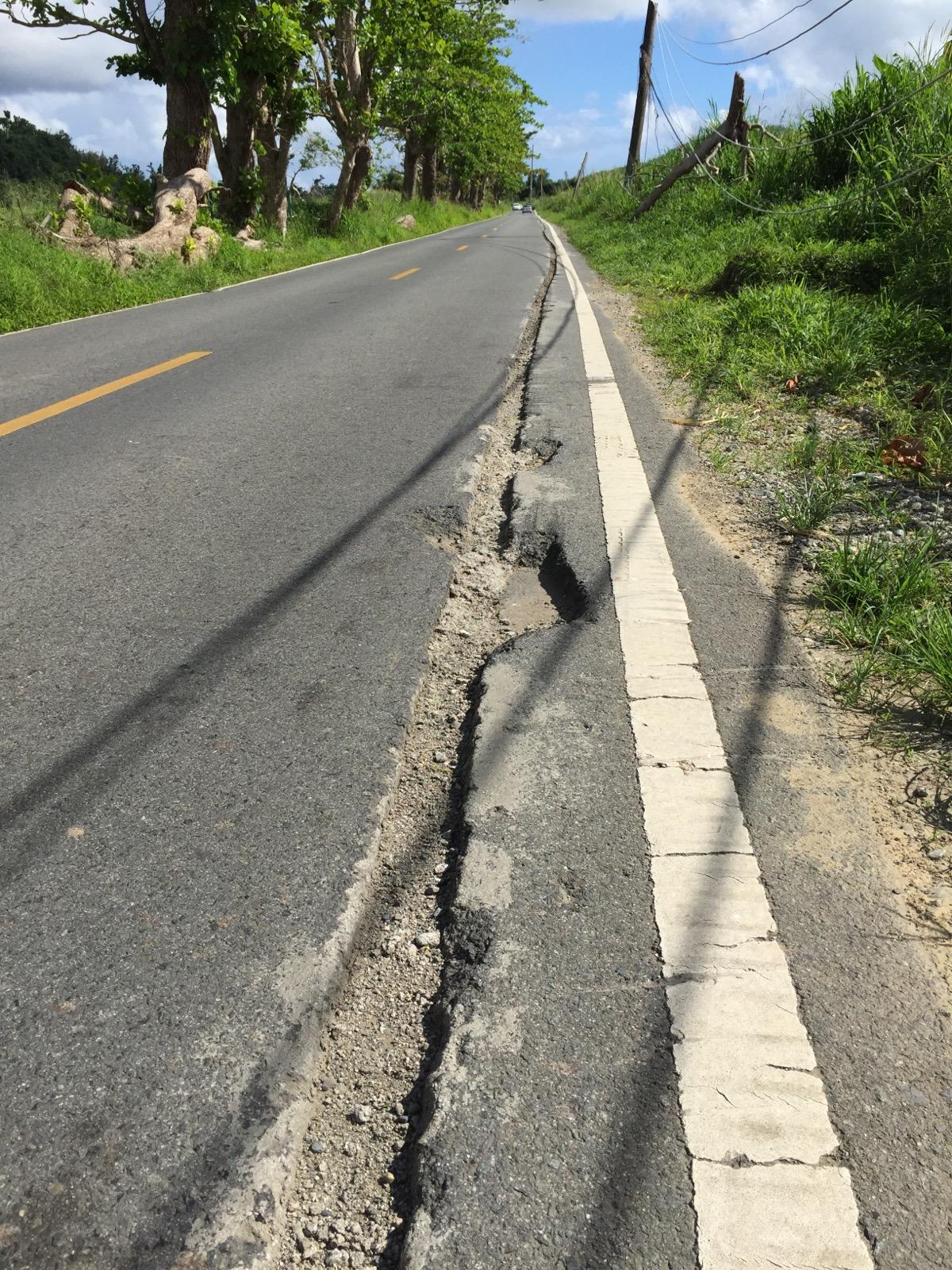
Road damage from an electrical fire caused by energized fallen power line caused by Hurricane Maria in Puerto Rico

Fires involving the danger of electrical hazards fall under Class (E) under the Australian system, and Class C under the US system. The European system previously assigned this Class E, but no longer has a specific classification for electrical fires, instead focussing on the ignited fuel type.

Electrical fires can result from the likes of faulty electrical equipment or wiring (for instance loose or corroded connections; deteriorated insulation; electrical arcing), overheating electrical components (possibly due to improper system or product design), or unintentional contact of electrical or electronic components with flammable materials. These fires can be a severe hazard to firefighters using water or other conductive agents, which upon contact with electrical sources can establish a conductive path through the firefighter to Earth. Such electric shocks have caused many firefighter deaths.

Electrical fires may be fought in the same way as an ordinary combustible fire, but water, foam, and other conductive agents should not be used due to the dangers just described. Instead an extinguishing agent specifically rated for electrical fires should be used. Carbon dioxide (CO_{2}), NOVEC 1230, FM-200, dry chemical powder extinguishers, and even baking soda are especially suited to extinguishing this sort of fire. PKP should be a last resort solution due to its corrosive tendencies.

Once electricity is shut off to the equipment involved, it will generally become an ordinary combustible fire.

=== Grease fires (cooking fires) ===
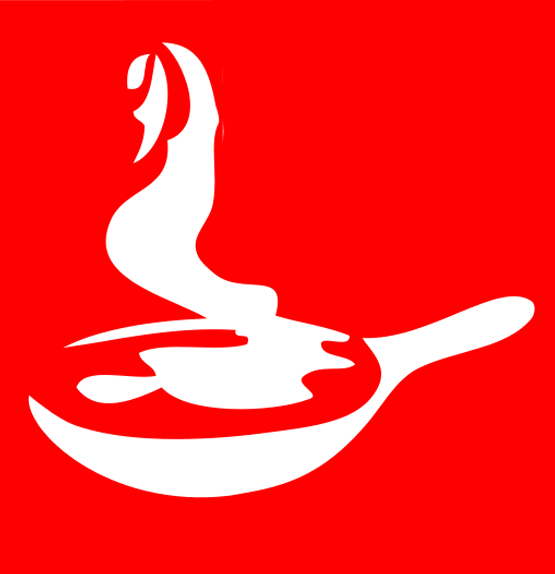

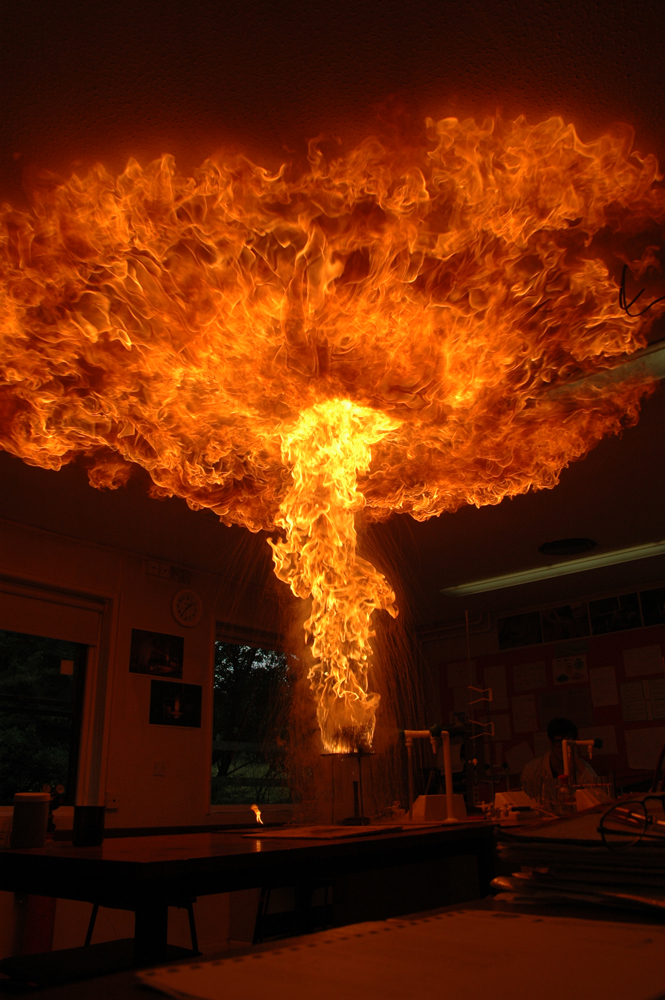
Laboratory simulation of a chip pan fire: a beaker containing wax is heated until it catches fire. A small amount of water is then poured into the beaker. The water vaporizes instantly (slopover), ejecting a plume of burning liquid wax into the air.

Fires involving cooking oils and fats (greases) fall under Class F under the European and Australian systems, and Class K under the US system. Though such fires are technically a subclass of the flammable liquid/gas class(es), the special characteristics of these types of fires, namely the higher flash point, are considered important enough to recognize them separately.

Some special extinguishers designed for this use smother the fire by turning the oil into a foam. As with Class B fires, a solid stream of water should never be used to extinguish this type because it can cause the fuel to scatter, spreading the flames. Commercial kitchens may have a fire suppression system built into exhaust hoods to release an extinguishing agent onto stove tops, releasing automatically with a fusible link or manually using a pull station.

If a fire blanket is used to extinguish burning liquids the liquid can soak into the blanket. A hot liquid might then lead to the self-ignition of the blanket. A blanket must therefore only be used if it does not act as a wick or if it is heavy enough to cool the liquid down below autoignition temperature. Preferably a lid or a similar solid item should be used to seal the burning container off from the surrounding atmosphere.

=== Lithium-ion cells and batteries ===
Fires involving lithium-ion cells and batteries are considered electrochemical fires, where the amount lithium metal itself inside the battery or cell is minuscule. Class L was introduced into ISO 3941:2026, to recognise rising instances of lithium-ion battery fires occurring in devices and vehicles that utilise high-capacity or high-power lithium-ion cells, and the hazards that lithium-ion battery fires uniquely pose: particularly thermal runaway, and the effort and resources required to extinguish even small fires ignited by lithium-ion batteries inside consumer electronic devices such as scooters. Many airlines have banned specific hand-held electronic devices containing lithium-ion batteries because of known safety issues and catastrophic effects that could result from a lithium-ion battery fire in the confined space of an aircraft.

==== Classification of lithium-ion battery fires in Australia ====
Whilst several manufacturers have released fire extinguishing agents for fires involving lithium-ion batteries, as of 2026, Australian standards do not recognise lithium-ion battery fires as their own specific class, and do not detail specific performance and safety criteria required to certify extinguishing agents against fires involving lithium-ion batteries, subsequently standardised testing procedures to determine the efficacy and safety of extinguishing agents used against lithium-ion fires do not currently exist. The Australian Competition and Consumer Commission (ACCC) publish mandatory Australian consumer safety standards that reference the relevant Australian standards with respect to fire extinguishers. In order to advertise a fire extinguisher as capable of dealing with a particular hazard, fire extinguisher products must comply with these ACCC standards, which make most parts of the voluntary Australian standards with respect to fire extinguishers mandatory. As a result, fire extinguishers advertised for sale in Australia, many of them imported from outside Australia, cannot claim to be certified against the Australian standards for extinguishing fires involving lithium-ion batteries or cells.

== See also ==
- Fire control
- Fire extinguisher
