= 2005 Mumbai High fire =

Offshore oil and gas disaster

Mumbai High fire
- Riser jet fire engulfing the production platform

- 2005 Mumbai High fire (India)
- Date: July 27, 2005
- Venue: Mumbai High North offshore oil production complex, Mumbai High oil field, off Maharashtra, India
- Location: 19°45′47″N 71°4′41″E
- Type: Gas riser jet fire
- Cause: Vessel collision against gas flowlines, as a result of high seas, vessel approach on the windward side and faulty positioning system
- Deaths: 11
- Missing: 11
- Property damage: Total loss of Mumbai High North complex (four platforms) and jack-up rig Noble Charlie Yester; Sinking of multi-purpose support vessel Samudra Suraksha; Financial damages estimated at $370 million ($552 million in 2020)

On July 27, 2005, a major fire struck ONGC's Mumbai High North offshore complex, located approximately 100 km (62 mi) off Mumbai, Maharashtra, India. The accident was the consequence of a collision between a support vessel and the production platform. The fire caused 22 fatalities (of whom 11 were recovered and 11 are missing) and material damage estimated at $370 million.

== Background ==
The Mumbai High oil field, the largest in India, is located in the Arabian Sea, approximately 170 km (110 mi) west of Mumbai. It is operated by ONGC and produces oil and gas, which are transported via pipeline to a processing plant in Uran. Located in the northern section of the field at about 100 km from shore was the original Mumbai High North production complex, consisting of four bridge-linked platforms: NA, a wellhead platform built in 1976; MHF, an accommodation platform, built in 1978; MHN, the production platform, built in 1981; and MNW, a processing platform housing the gas compression and water injection facilities. The complex imported well fluids from 11 unmanned wellhead platforms and exported oil and gas to shore, as well as gas for gas lift. The North complex had a production capacity of 180,000 barrels per day (28,600 m^{3}/day, or about 40% of India's domestic production) and 148 MMSCFD.

At the time of the accident, the jack-up Noble Charlie Yester was positioned over NA to carry out well workover operations. It was monsoon season and the sea conditions were particularly rough, with winds of 22 to 25 knots (41 to 46 km/h; 25 to 29 mph), currents of 1.8 to 2 knots (3.3 to 3.7 km/h; 2.1 to 2.3 mph) and swell of 4 to 5 metres (13 to 16 ft).

== Events ==
On the day of the accident, the 100 m (330 ft)-long multi-purpose support vessel (MSV) Samudra Suraksha, owned by ONGC and operated by the Shipping Corporation of India (SCI), was supporting diving operations elsewhere in the field. At about 14:00 local time a cook onboard the MSV got injured having sliced off the tips of two of his fingers. Medical evacuation to shore was deemed necessary by the MSV master, and this was seconded by ONGC. A helicopter was at the time parked on MHN, however it could not fly to Samudra Suraksha due to the rough seas making a landing there unsafe. Shortly before 15:00, the Mumbai High North offshore installation manager (OIM) received a request for the transfer of the injured person onboard MHN. The transfer had to be accomplished using a man-riding basket lifted from one of the platform cranes. The OIM and the master agreed on the use of the south crane, which was located on the windward side of the platform, an arrangement that made the MSV approach more complicated. There was a crane on the leeward side of the platform but it was not operable. The vessel experienced an issue with her dynamic positioning system, having been observed at around 15:30 that her starboard azimuth thruster pitch was sluggish. The chief engineer requested some time to fix the issue. However, the master decided to proceed with the approach to the platform, operating the thrusters manually and using an emergency source of control via pushbuttons. The MSV was brought in stern-first with wind at 35 knots (65 km/h; 40 mph), swell of 5 m (16 ft), and sea current of 3 knots (5.6 km/h; 3.5 mph). The transfer of the injured person was completed, however the strong swell subsequently pushed the MSV against the platform. Her helideck collided with and severed one or more gas export risers, which were supported from the platform jacket. Crucially, they had been installed outside the jacket structure footprint, which made them liable to be struck in case of ship collision. They were protected by structural guards, but these had been designed for collision from smaller offshore supply vessels (OSV), not larger MSVs. The gas release immediately ignited, resulting in a massive jet fire. Flames quickly engulfed Samudra Suraksha. The fire escalated to further risers, which lacked fire protection, and eventually engulfed all the production platform, including its process plant, as well as the accommodation platform MHF. NA and the jack-up rig were severely affected by thermal radiation. Within two hours from the fire onset, MHN collapsed into the sea.

At the time there were 384 persons in the complex, including the MSV and jack-up rig personnel. Of these, 362 were rescued over the next 15 hours and 22 perished (of which 11 bodies were recovered and 11 are missing). The severity of the fire hampered the evacuation and rescue efforts. Only two out of the eight lifeboats of the complex proper were launched, and only one out of 10 liferafts. The Samudra Prabha, a diving support vessel (DSV) operated by SCI like the Suraksha, was in the field at the time and was among the first providing assistance to the emergency operations. She started firefighting operations using fire monitors, of which she had four with a capacity of 1,800 m^{3}/h (18,000 cu ft/ks) each. The Indian Navy, ONGC, and various supply boats also participated in the emergency and rescue operations. Several crew members of the complex sought safety by jumping directly to the sea. Rescued persons were transferred to supply boats for passage to Mumbai. Rescue helicopters remained unavailable due to weather conditions.

Prabha eventually shifted the firefighting efforts on Suraksha, which was drifting dangerously at the mercy of the swell and the current. At the time of the accident, six divers were in a saturation chamber on the MSV; they were rescued 36 hours after the shipboard fire was put off. Suraksha was handed over to tugboats for towing to shore. However, she sank four days after the fire, when she was a short distance off Mumbai.

== Aftermath ==
The whole complex became a total loss and the field production was impacted for years until a new Mumbai High North complex was built. No official investigation report has been issued publicly by either the Indian authorities or ONGC. Subsequent to the disaster, however, the Indian government empowered its Oil Industry Safety Directorate (OISD) with stronger capacities of action to promote safety in the local offshore oil and gas industry and counter poor safety practices, including in particular the mandate for the regulation of offshore safety.

=== Analysis and lessons learned ===
The following issues of interest, as well as lessons learnt in process safety, have been pointed out in the years after the accident:

- Vulnerability of flowlines and risers to ship collisions:
  - Hydrocarbon flowlines and risers on fixed offshore platforms should not be exposed to potential vessel collisions. In the spirit of inherently safer design, this is firstly achieved by ensuring they are placed inside the jacket envelope. Alternatively, they should be protected by structural guards designed for credible collision scenarios.
  - Avoiding any lift or other vessel operation in proximity to the risers is another effective measure to prevent riser-threatening collisions. Again, an inherent design approach would altogether avoid lifting appliances and laydown areas on the edge of the platform closest to the risers. Locating the risers away from the prevailing weather is also advisable. Further, strict procedures to prevent any vessel approach to said side of the platform should be put in place by the operating company.
- Riser fire protection: The risers on MHN had no fire protection arrangements. In the aftermath of the Piper Alpha disaster, it became apparent that riser jet fires can result in the rapid catastrophic loss of an offshore facility. This is due to the high fluid pressures and the large fuel inventory contained in the pipeline, which upon breach of containment becomes available for long lasting fires. It is therefore essential that fires occurring elsewhere in the platform do not cause failure of the risers; this also applies to protecting the risers from fires originating from other risers (the scenario that occurred at Mumbai High). In the wake of Lord Cullen's report, the British offshore industry first, followed by the rest of the world, have gradually implemented policies by which the risk of riser fire is quantitatively assessed and riser passive fire protection is installed accordingly. The fireproofing of the risers all the way down to the water surface is still rare. Passive fire protection of riser boarding shutdown valves is far more common, although not universally practiced. Another practice that is sometimes used, subject to risk assessment, is the use of subsea isolation valves (SSIVs); these are pipeline isolation valves placed in the vicinity of the platform, which enable the sectionalization and consequent dramatic reduction of the inventory available to the fire.
- Management of marine operations around the complex: The MSV master and the offshore installation manager found themselves in the dilemma of deciding between aborting a medevac they saw necessary, and having to complete a dangerous vessel approach to the platform under difficult circumstances (bad weather, unavailability of the leeward crane, and faulty dynamic positioning system). Even comprehensive emergency management plans may not include such an eventuality. However, a posteriori it has become clear that a vessel the size of Samudra Suraksha should not have been allowed to approach the platform, especially in the circumstances in which it happened. The importance of enforcing the so-called 500 metres exclusion zone has been stressed from various sources.
- Evacuation of divers from hyperbaric chambers.
