= Piper oilfield =

Oilfield in the North Sea

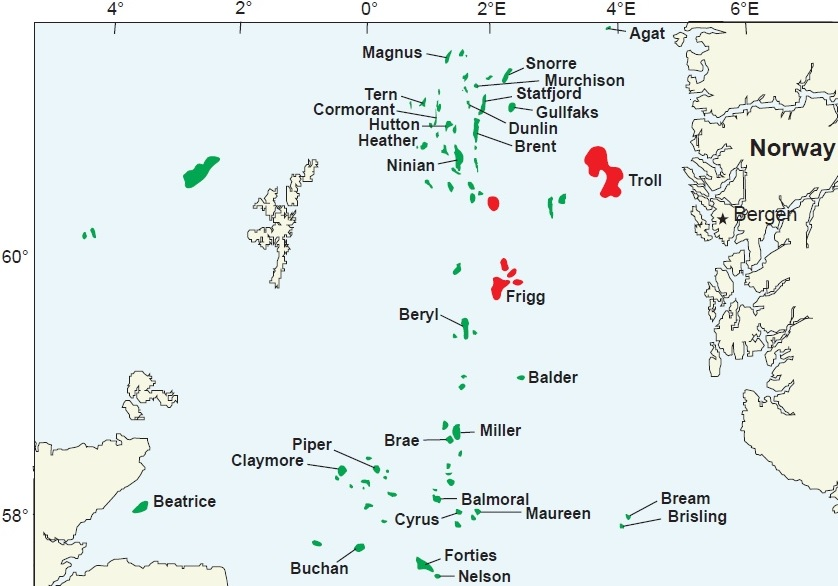
- North Sea Oil and Gas Fields

- Location within North Sea
- Country: Scotland, United Kingdom
- Location: North Sea
- Offshore/onshore: Offshore
- Coordinates: 58.28°N 0.12°E
- Operator: Repsol Resources UK

Field history
- Discovery: 1973
- Start of production: 1976

Production
- Peak of production (oil): 300,000 barrels per day (~1.5×10^{7} t/a)

The Piper oilfield is a substantial North Sea oilfield covering 30.1 square kilometres (11 1/2 mi^{2}). It lies roughly halfway between Aberdeen and Bergen, at the eastern end of the Moray Firth basin. Oil extracted from it is piped to Scotland, where it is stabilised at an oil plant on the island of Flotta, in the Orkney archipelago, while gas is shipped via the Frigg gas pipeline. In June 1975, the Piper Alpha oil platform was placed over the field in 144 metres (79 fathoms) of water, secured in place by 24 piles extending 144 metres (79 fathoms) beneath the seabed. The platform was designed for simultaneous drilling and production. Piper Alpha was the site of the world's deadliest oil platform disaster when it was destroyed by an explosion in 1988, with the loss of 167 lives. Piper Bravo was installed in 1992. Talisman Energy acquired a controlling interest in 2000.

Occidental Petroleum Corp., Getty Oil (Britain) Ltd., Thomson North Sea Ltd., and Allied Chemical (North Sea) Ltd., that later transformed into the OPCAL joint venture, obtained an oil exploration licence in 1972 and discovered the Piper oilfield in early 1973 after seismically mapping the area. Oil production started in 1976 with about 250,000 barrels per day (40,000 m^{3}/d) increasing to 300,000 barrels per day (48,000 m^{3}/d). A gas recovery module was installed by 1980. Production declined to 125,000 barrels per day (19,900 m^{3}/d) by 1988. OPCAL built the Flotta oil terminal in the Orkney Islands to receive and process oil from the Piper, Claymore and Tartan fields, each with its own platform. A 30-inch (760 mm) diameter main oil pipeline ran 128 miles (206 km) from Piper Alpha to Flotta, with a short oil pipeline from the Claymore platform joining it some 20 miles (32 km) to the west. The Tartan field also fed oil to Claymore and then onto the main line to Flotta. Separate 46 cm (18 in) diameter gas pipelines run from Piper to the Tartan platform, and from Piper to the gas compressing platform MCP-01 some 30 miles (48 km) to the northwest.

== Geology ==
The field consists of three folded, tilted blocks on the northern edge of the Witch Ground Graben. Production is from the Upper Jurassic Piper Sandstone, a sandstone shelf with a thickness up to 142 metres (466 ft) and Oil-water contact ranging in depths from 2,195 to 2,804 metres (7,201 to 9,199 ft) under the sea. Piper oil most likely originated in the Kimmeridge Shale.

== See also ==
- Energy policy of the United Kingdom
- Energy use and conservation in the United Kingdom
