= Piper Bravo =

North Sea oil production platform

Piper Bravo is a North Sea oil production platform originally operated by Occidental Petroleum (Caledonia) Ltd, and now owned by Repsol Sinopec Energy UK.

Piper Bravo is an eight-legged fixed steel jacket supported platform, located 193 kilometres northeast of Aberdeen in the Piper oilfield in the central North Sea. It stands in 145 metres of water. It was installed in 1992, and commenced production in February 1993. It replaced the Piper Alpha platform which exploded in July 1988 killing 167 men. It is located approximately 120 metres from the wreck buoy marking the remains of its predecessor (at 58°27′35″N 0°15′04″E).
