= Offshore Industry Liaison Committee =

Former trade union of the United Kingdom

OILC
- Offshore Industry Liaison Committee
- Founded: 6 July 1989
- Dissolved: April 2008 (merged with RMT)
- Type: Trade union
- Location: United Kingdom
- Origins: Piper Alpha disaster
- Website: www.oilc.org

The Offshore Industry Liaison Committee (OILC) was a trade union set up in the United Kingdom in response to the deaths of 167 workers on the Piper Alpha platform on 6 July 1988. The death of another worker on the Ocean Odyssey oil rig on 22 September 1988 and other accidents also played a part in spurring its foundation. The union, still in the form of an unofficial committee drawn from different North Sea rigs, organized large strikes in the summers of 1989 and 1990.

The OILC is now a branch of the National Union of Rail, Maritime and Transport Workers (RMT), having agreed to merge from April 2008.
