= Jet fire =

High temperature flame from pressurised fuel

A jet fire is a high temperature flame of burning fuel released under pressure in a particular orientation. The material burned is a continuous stream of flammable gas, liquid or a two-phase mixture. A jet fire is a significant hazard in process and storage plants which handle or keep flammable fluids under pressure. The heat flux of the jet flame can cause rapid mechanical failure thereby compromising structural integrity and leading to incident escalation.

== Context ==
The Piper Alpha disaster in 1988 demonstrated how the accidental release of hydrocarbon can lead to the catastrophic failure of an installation with the rupture of major pipeline risers. Jet fires impinged on vessels, pipework and firewalls. Under these conditions the fireproofing material was compromised within a few minutes rather than one to two hours, which had been specified. Even without direct impingement, the high thermal radiation emitted by jet flames also affected plant and would have been fatal to personnel.

== Characteristics ==
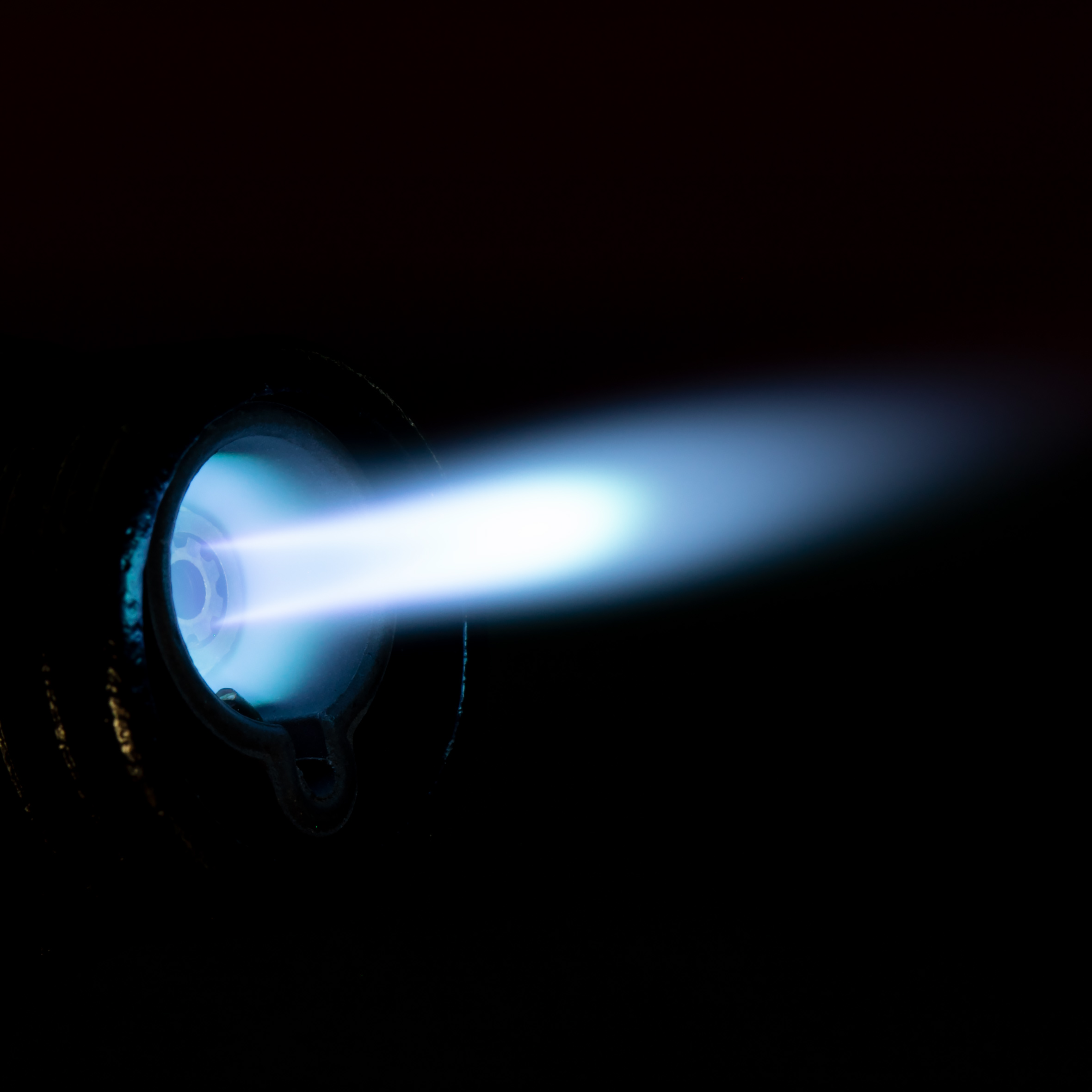
A blowtorch is an example of a small, controlled jet fire.

A jet fire, also known as a spray fire if the fuel is a liquid or liquefied gas, is a turbulent diffusion flame of flammable material. The characteristics of a jet fire depend on a number of factors. These include: fuel composition; release conditions; release rate; release geometry; direction; and ambient wind conditions.

For full details of the mechanism and structure of jet fires see High Pressure Jet.

Some characteristics of specific jet fires are:

- Sonic releases of natural gas are characterized by high velocity, low buoyancy flames that are relatively non-luminous with low radiative energy,
- A jet flame of higher hydrocarbons is lazy, buoyant, luminous, with the presence of black smoke at the tail of the flame, they are highly radiative,
- The surface emissive power (SEP) of jet flames is in the order of 200 kW/m^{2} to 400 kW/m^{2}. Such flames have a temperature of 1350 °C. These high heat fluxes can readily compromise the integrity of structures and vessels and can lead to mechanical failure of plant and equipment.
- A jet fire is a particular hazard to personnel. People are able to survive and escape from exposure to heat fluxes less than 5 kW/m^{2}, while higher fluxes can be fatal.

== Designing for jet fires ==
A processing plant is generally protected by a pressure relief system. However, local heating of a pressure vessel by a jet fire may compromise the integrity of the vessel before any associated pressure relief device operates. The measures taken for protection against jet fires are as follows:

- Prevention of leaks using effective maintenance
- Flange orientation and elimination
- Blowdown systems, to reduce the inventory and pressure in the plant
- Isolation of leaks
- Robust external insulation
- Emergency response

Water deluge can reduce the heat loading of plant so that its temperature is maintained below that at which failure occurs, or that the temperature rise is sufficiently reduced such that shutdown and depressurization can take place.

Older plants may have been sized on an earlier version of the American Petroleum Institute's Pressure-Relieving and Depressuring Systems standard, which did not include consideration of jet fires.

The international standard publication ISO 22899 (Determination of the Resistance to Jet Fires of Passive Fire Protection Materials) sets requirements for the specification of passive fire protection against jet fires.

== See also ==
- High pressure jet
- Process hazard analysis
- Process safety
