= High pressure jet =

Contour animation of the mole fraction variation (from 0.025 to 0.05) of a Natural Gas jet as it impinges a steel tank done through CFD.

A high pressure jet is a stream of pressurized fluid that is released from an environment at a significantly higher pressure than ambient pressure from a nozzle or orifice, due to operational or accidental release. In the field of safety engineering, the release of toxic and flammable gases has been the subject of many R&D studies because of the major risk that they pose to the health and safety of workers, equipment and environment. Intentional or accidental release may occur in an industrial settings like natural gas processing plants, oil refineries and hydrogen storage facilities.

A main focus during a risk assessment process is the estimation of the gas cloud extension and dissipation, important parameters that allow to evaluate and establish safety limits that must be respected in order to minimize the possible damage after a high pressure release.

== Mechanism and structure of a gaseous jet ==
=== Subsonic and sonic flow ===
When a pressurized gas is released, the velocity of the flow will heavily depend on the pressure difference between stagnant pressure and downstream pressure. By assuming an isentropic expansion of an ideal gas from its stagnant conditions (P_{0} , meaning the velocity of the gas is zero) to downstream conditions (P_{1}, positioned at the exit plane of the nozzle or orifice), the subsonic flow rate of the source term is given by Ramskill's formulation:

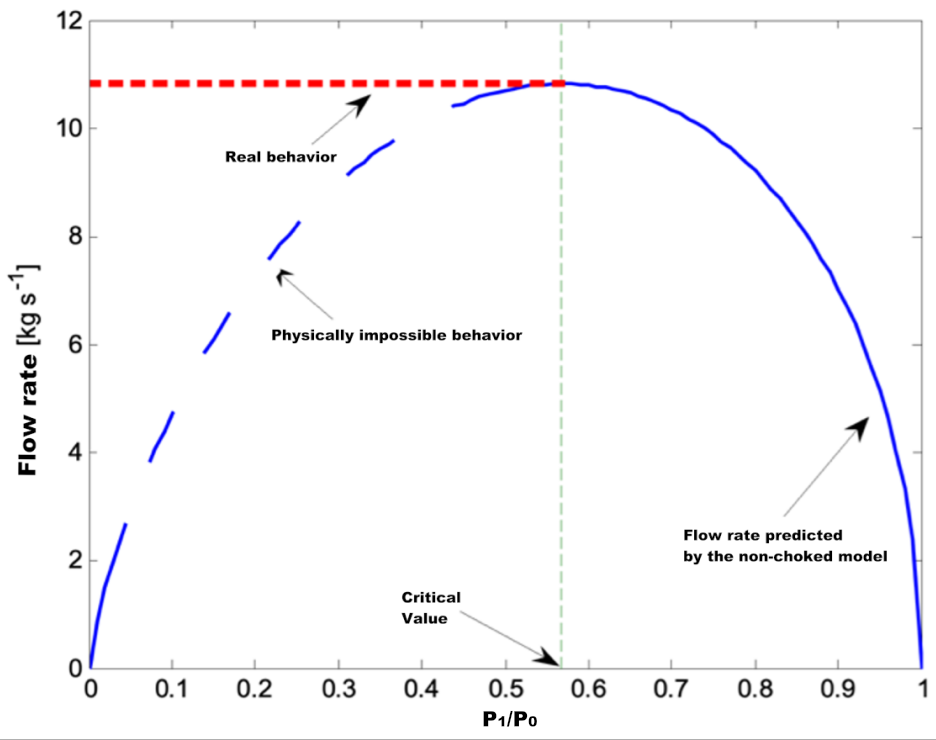
The flow rate of an ideal gas can be represented by the graphed line. As the pressure ratio decreases and the critical value is approached, the flow changes from non-choked to choked, setting an upper limit to the velocity of the gas to the speed of sound of the medium.

$$Q \;=\; C_D\;A_o\;\rho_1\;\sqrt{\;2\;\frac{P_0}{ \rho_0\ }\;\left[\frac{ \gamma\ }{ \gamma\ - 1}\right]\left[ 1 -\;\,\left(\frac{\;P_1}{P_0}\right)^\frac{ \gamma\ - 1}{ \gamma\ }\;\right]}$$

As the ratio between downstream condition pressure and stagnant condition pressure decreases, the flow rate of the ideal gas will increase. This behavior will continue until a critical value is reached (in air, P_{1}/P_{0} is roughly 0.528, dependent on the heat capacity ratio, γ), changing the condition of the jet from a non-choked flow to a choked flow. This will lead to the a newly defined expression for the aforementioned pressure ratio and, sub-sequentially, the flow rate equation.

The critical value for the pressure ratio is defined as:

$$\frac{\;P_1}{P_0}\;=\; \left[\frac{2}{ \gamma\ + 1 }\right]^\left(\frac{ \gamma\ }{ \gamma\ - 1 }\right)$$

This newly defined ratio can then be used to determine the flow rate for a sonic choked flow:

$$Q \;=\; C_D\;A_o\;\rho_1\;V_c$$

The flow rate equation for a choked flow will have a fixed velocity, which is the speed of sound of the medium, where the Mach number is equals to 1:

$$V_c\;=\;\sqrt{\;\frac{T_1\; \gamma\ R}{ M }}$$

Where:
Q	= mass flow rate, kg/s
V_{c}	= speed of sound of the medium, m/s
C_{D}	= discharge coefficient, dimensionless (its value is chosen relative to the orifice shape)
A_{o}	= orifice/nozzle exit plane area, m^{2}
γ	= heat capacity ratio of the gas
ρ_{0}	= gas density at P_{0} and T_{0} , kg/m^{3}
ρ_{1}	= gas density at P_{1} and T_{1} , kg/m^{3}
T_{0}	= Temperature in stagnant conditions, K
T_{1}	= Temperature in downstream conditions, K
P_{0}	= absolute pressure in stagnant conditions, Pa
P_{1}	= absolute pressure in downstream conditions, Pa
M	= the ideal gas molecular weight, kg/kmol
R	= the Universal Gas Law Constant = 8.3145 J/(mol·K)

If P_{1} keeps on decreasing, no flow rate change will occur if the ratio is already below the critical value, unless P_{0} also changes (also assuming that the orifice/nozzle exit area and upstream temperature stay the same).

=== Under-expanded jet structure ===
An under-expanded jet is one that manifests when the pressure at downstream conditions (at the end of a nozzle or orifice) is greater that the pressure of the environment where the gas is being released in. It is said to be under-expanded since the gas will expand, trying to reach the same pressure of its surroundings. When under-expanded, the jet will have characteristics of a compressible flow, a condition in which pressure variations are significant enough to have a strong effect on the velocity (where it can exceed the speed of sound of the gas), density and temperature. As the jet expands and incorporates gases from the surrounding medium, the jet will behave more and more like an incompressible fluid, allowing for a general definition of the structure of a jet to be the following:

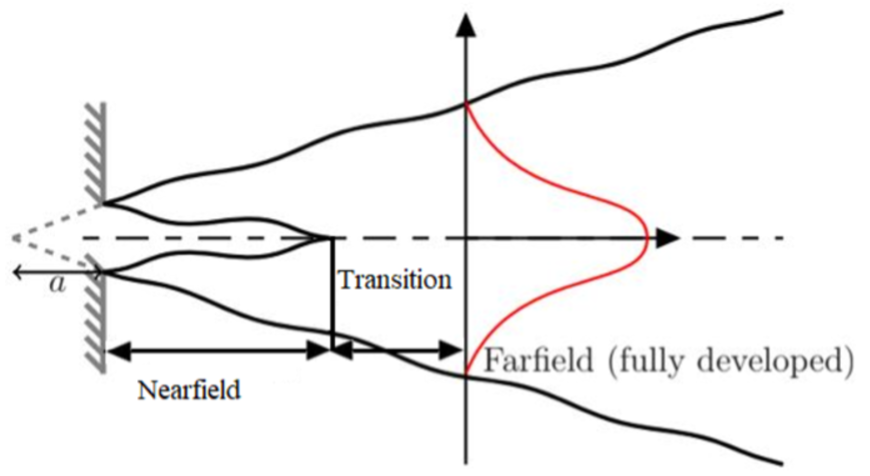
The subdivision of a high pressure jet as it expands to the pressure of the surrounding conditions.

- Nearfield zone: this zone is composed of a core layer that is isolated from the surrounding medium, with its behavior being mostly dominated by compressible effects, and an outer layer that is in contact with the surrounding medium fluid. Due to turbulent effects, the outer layer, nominated as mixing layer, permits gas entrainment as it is facilitated, diluting the jet. In this shearing zone, a subsonic and supersonic section may be distinguished, where temperature, density and pressure vary wildly in a few centimeters of distance from the source. This zone has the characteristics of a compressible fluid.
- Transition zone: the beginning of this zone represents the ending of the nearfield zone, where variations (longitudinally and radially to the axis of the jet) are small compared to the previous one. Density and temperature variations are mostly because of mixing with the surrounding fluid.
- Farfield zone: this final zone is one of a fully expanded and incompressible jet. Longitudinal velocity and temperature are now inversely proportional to the distance from the source and radial evolution can be described by a gaussian dispersion model. This zone can be further split into inertial (dominated by initial acceleration), buoyant (dominated by internal buoyancy forces) and turbulent zones (dominated by ambient turbulence).

==== Under-expanded jet classification ====
Further classification of the jet can be related to how the nearfield zone develops due to the compressible effects that govern it. When the jet first exists the orifice or nozzle, it will expand very quickly, resulting in an over-expansion of the flow (which will also reduce the temperature and density of the flow as quickly as it depressurized). Gases that have expanded to a pressure lower than that of the surrounding fluid will be compressed inwards, causing an increase in the pressure of the flow. If this re-compression leads to the fluid having a higher pressure than the surrounding fluid, another expansion will happen. This process will repeat until the pressure difference between ambient pressure and jet pressure is null (or close to null). Compression and expansion are accomplished through a series of shock waves, formed as a result of Prandlt-Meyer expansion and compression waves.

Development of the aforementioned shock waves will be related to the difference in pressure between the stagnant conditions or downstream conditions and the ambient conditions (η_{0} = P_{0}/P_{amb} and η_{e} = P_{1}/P_{amb}, respectively), as well as the mach number (Ma = V/V_{c}, where V is the velocity of the flow and V_{c} is the speed of sound of the medium). With varying pressure ratios, under-expanded jets can be classified as:

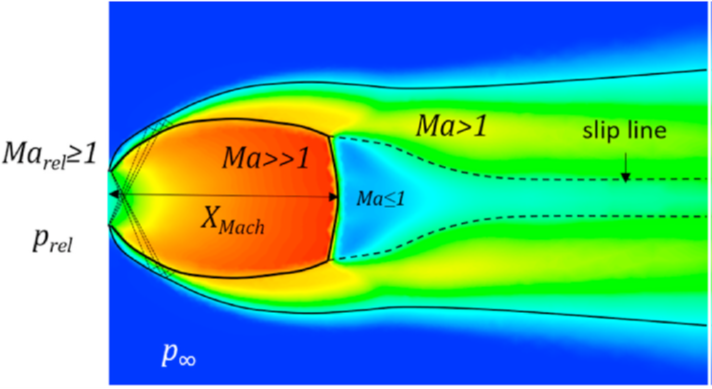
A CFD simulation of a natural gas extremely under-expanded jet. Sections where the Mach Number is much higher than 1 are points in which the velocity of the fluid is much higher than the speed of sound, an effect that manifest due to the sudden depressurization of the gas. P_{∞} is ambient pressure of 101325 Pa

- Moderately under-expanded jet: Nearfield with diamond shaped structures (each structure is called a cell). A Prandlt-Meyer expansion generates oblique expansion waves that expand the fluid downstream from the exit orifice. As these waves attain constant pressure from the surrounding fluid, they are deflected back as compression waves, converging in oblique shock waves (called intercepting shock). When they meet on the axis of the jet, reflected shock waves move outwardly until they attain constant pressure from the surrounding fluid, repeating the process, and in turn, recreating the cell structure (this phenomenon occurs in air at a range of 2 ≤ η_{0} ≤ 4 or 1.1 ≤ η_{e} ≤ 3).
- Highly under-expanded jet: Nearfield with barrel shaped structures. As the pressure ratio increases, the intercepting shock waves can't meet on the axis of the jet anymore, which forces the generation of a normal shock wave when the intercepting shock waves go beyond a certain critical angle (The normal shock wave is called Mach Disk). From the interception point of the mach disk and the intercepting shock, a residual slipstream will reflect outwardly, until it reaches constant pressure from the surrounding fluid, repeating the process, recreating the barrel shaped cell structure (this phenomenon occurs in air at a range of 5 ≤ η_{0} ≤ 7 or 2 ≤ η_{e} ≤ 4 ).
- Extremely under-expanded jet: Nearfield with a single cell structure. When the pressure ratio goes beyond a critical value (in air at a range of η_{0} ≥ 7 or η_{e} ≥ 4 ), cell numbers within the nearfield of the jet decrease, until they all coalesce into a single cell with a single mach disk. Due to the increase in velocity and lower pressure zones around the jet, ambient fluid entrainment will increase.

== Natural gas release ==
Amongst incidental scenarios, natural gas releases have become particularly relevant within the process industry environment. With an overall composition of 94.7% of methane, it is important to consider how this gas can cause incremental damage when it is released. Methane gas is a non-toxic, flammable gas, that, at higher concentrations, can behave as an asphyxiant due to oxygen displacement from the lungs. The main concern with methane is related to its flammability and the potential damage that could be dealt to its surroundings if the high pressure jet were to ignite into a jet fire.

Three parameters that must be considered when dealing with flammable gasses are their flash point (FP), upper flammability limit (UFL) and lower flammability limit (LFL), as they are set values for any compound at a specific pressure and temperature. If we consider the fire triangle model, to induce a combustion reaction three components are needed: a fuel, an oxidizing agent and heat. When release happens in an ambient filled with air, the oxidizing agent will be oxygen (air has a constant concentration of 21% in standard conditions). At an almost pure concentration, a few centimeters from the exit plane, the concentration of natural gas is too high and oxygen too low to generate any kind of combustion reaction, but as the high pressure jet develops, the concentration of its components will dilute as air entrainment increases, allowing an enrichment of oxygen within the jet. Assuming a constant concentration for oxygen, the jet must dilute enough to enter within its flammability range; below its UFL. Within this range, a flammable mixture can be made and any source of heat can jump-start the reaction.

To properly judge the damage and potential risk that the jet fire can generate, several studies regarding the maximum distance that the cloud generated by the jet can reach have been made. As dilution of the jet continues due to air entrainment in the farfield, going below its UFL, the maximum distance that the flammable mixture can reach is at the point in which the concentration of the cloud is equals to the LFL of the gas, as it is the lowest concentration allowable that permits the formation of a flammable mixture between air and natural gas at standard conditions (the LFL for natural gas is 4%). Considering a free jet at sub-critical pressure (beyond the nearfield zone), its mean volume fraction axial concentration decay of any gas released in air can be defined as follows:

$$\bar{ \eta\ } \;=\;\frac{ k\; d}{z + a}\sqrt{\;\frac{ \rho_a\ }{ \rho_g\ }}$$

Where:
$\bar{ \eta\ }$	= mean volume fraction axial concentration of the gas, [-]
k	= experimental constant coefficient, [-]
d	= orifice diameter, m
z	= downstream distance, m
a	= virtual origin displacement, m
ρ_{a}	= air density, kg/m^{3}
ρ_{g}	= released gas density, kg/m^{3}

=== Computational Fluid Dynamics ===
Experimental data of high pressure jets have to be limited in terms of size and complexity of the scenario due to the inherit dangers and expenses correlated to the experiment itself. Alternative methods to gather data, such as representative models, can be used in order to predict what the maximum extend of the gas cloud at its LFL concentration can reach. Simpler models like a gaussian gas dispersion model (e.g., SCREEN3 - a dispersion model) or integral model (e.g., PHAST- an integral model) can be useful to have a quick and qualitative overview on how the jet may extend. Unfortunately, their inability to properly simulate jet-obstacle interactions make them impossible to use beyond preliminary calculations. This is the reason why Computational Fluid Dynamic (CFD) simulations are generally preferred for more complex scenarios.

Although there exists several approaches for CFD simulations, a common approach is the use of a finite volume method that discretizes the volume into smaller cells of varying shapes. Every single cell will represent a fluid-filled volume where the scenarios parameters will be applied. Every cell that was modeled solves a set of conservation equations of mass, momentum and energy, along with the continuity equation. Fluid-obstacle interaction is then modeled with varying algorithms based on the closure turbulent model used. Depending on the number of total cells within the volume, the better the quality of the simulation, the longer the simulation time. Convergence problems can arise within the simulation as large momentum, mass and energy gradients appear in the volume. The points where these problems are expected to appear (like in the nearfield zone of the jet) need to have a higher number of cells to achieve gradual changes between one cell and another. Ideally, through CFD simulations, a simpler model can be derived which, for a specific set of scenarios, allows to have results with an accuracy and precision level similar to the CFD simulation itself.

==== Birch's Approach ====
Through a set of small scale experiments at varying pressures, Birch et al. formulated an equation that allowed the estimation of a virtual surface source, considering the conservation of mass between the exit plane of the orifice and the virtual surface. This approach allows to simulate a compressible, under-expanded jet as an incompressible, fully-expanded jet. As a consequence, a simpler CFD model can be simulated by using the following diameter (named pseudo-diameter) as the new exit plane:

$$d_{ps}\;=\; d\;\sqrt{\;C_D\;\left(\frac{T_2}{T_0}\right)^{0.5}\left(\frac{P_0}{P_2}\right)\left(\frac{2}{ \gamma\ + 1 }\right)^\left(\frac{1+ \gamma\ }{ 2\gamma\ - 2 }\right)}$$

Where:
d_{ps}	= Birch's pseudo diameter, m
d	= orifice diameter, m
T_{0}	= temperature in stagnant conditions, K
T_{2}	= temperature in ambient conditions, K
P_{0}	= pressure in stagnant conditions, Pa
P_{2}	= pressure in ambient conditions, Pa

===== Ground and obstacle interaction =====
In the process industry, there exist a variety of cases where a high pressure jet release incident can occur. LNG storage facilities or NG pipeline systems leakage can degenerate into a jet fire and, through a domino effect, cause heavy damage to the workforce, equipment and surrounding environment. For different scenarios that may happen, safety protocols have to be engineered that aim to set minimum distances between equipment and the workforce, along with preventive systems that reduce the danger of the potential incidental scenario. The following are some of the most common scenarios that may be encountered in an industrial environment:

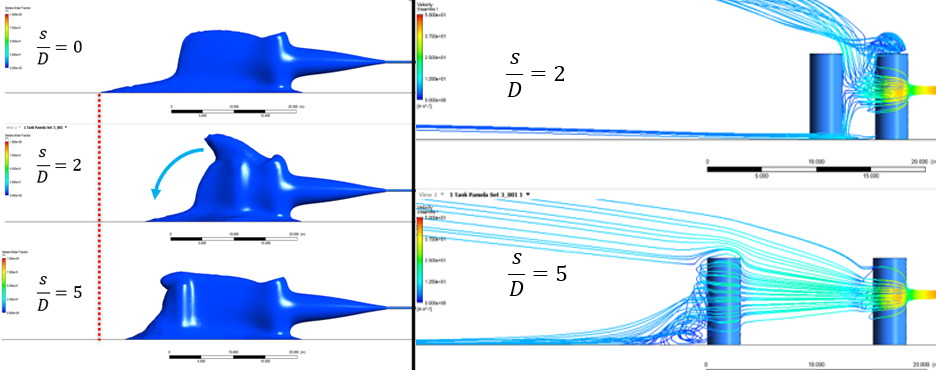
Jet-tank-ground interaction will have an effect on the maximum extension of the cloud at LFL concentrations. Eddies generated after their interactions will promote gas dissipation. s represents the distance between the center of the two tanks, D is the diameter of the tanks

- Jet-Ground interaction: this is one of the most common scenarios, where the free jet does not interact with any other obstacle apart from the ground. Although the jet can dissipate to concentrations below its LFL after roughly 16 meters with no interactions (interaction with concrete and at stagnant pressure of 65 bar, a common pressure for NG pipelines, with an orifice size of 2.54 mm), as the jet gets closer to the ground and makes contact with it, a dragging effect leads to a further extension. The jet has the tendency of bending downwards if close enough to the ground because of lower pressure zones below it.
- Jet-horizontal tank interaction: jet-tank interaction will depend of the type of material used. For cylindrical steel tanks, the distance from the exit plane will have an effect with the interaction, along with its angle with respect to the axis of the jet and the height of the release of the jet. Generally, when the jet impinges the horizontal tank along the axis of the tank, the jet is brought downwards, allowing an interaction with the ground. This will often lead to the extension of the jet at its LFL concentration with respect to its free jet (the same scenario is simulated with no other obstacles but the ground). Furthermore, crosswise extension is also expected.
- Jet-vertical tank interaction: for a cylindrical steel tank, the distance from the exit plane will have an effect with the interaction. Generally, when the jet impinges the vertical tank along the axis of the tank, the obstacle will act as a limiting factor for the extension of the jet at its LFL concentration with respect to its free jet. The impact with the tank will generate more eddies downstream the tail of the jet and limit ground interaction (at low enough flow rates and speeds), speeding up dilution of the gas below its lower flammable limit.
- Jet-horizontal tandem tank interaction: by adding a second horizontal tank behind the first, a shortening effect is achieved. The presence of the second obstacle leads to eddy generation after the first, promoting dissipation. Moreover, the second obstacle may have a detachment effect of the jet from the ground, as it will tend to adhere to the round surface of the second tank due to the coanda effect. Distance between the two tanks will have an effect, since, after a certain distance, the second obstacle will no longer have an effect on the cloud at LFL concentration.
- Jet-vertical tandem tank interaction: by adding a second vertical tank behind the first, a shortening effect will generally be achieved. The presence of the second obstacle leads to eddy generation after the first, promoting dissipation. Contrary to the previous scenario, the second obstacle can allow for jet-ground interaction and elongate the jet, a quality that be worsen due to the coanda effect. Distance between the two tanks will have an effect, since, after a certain distance, the second obstacle will no longer have an effect on the cloud at LFL concentration.

== See also ==
- Choked flow
- De Laval nozzle
- Restrictive flow orifice
- Rocket engine nozzle
- Venturi effect
