= Structural composite supercapacitor =

Multifunctional material for energy storage

Structural composite supercapacitors are multifunctional materials that can both bear mechanical load and store electrical energy. That when combined with structural batteries, could potentially enable an overall weight reduction of electric vehicles.

Typically, structural composite supercapacitors are based on the design of carbon fiber reinforced polymers. Carbon fibers act as mechanical reinforcement, current collectors, and eventually electrodes.

The matrix of a Structural composite supercapacitor is a polymer electrolyte that transfers load via shear mechanisms between the carbon fibers and has a reasonable ionic conductivity.

In a supercapacitor, the specific capacitance is proportional to the exact surface area of the electrodes. Structural carbon fibers usually have low specific surface area, and is therefore necessary to modify their surface to enable sufficient energy storage ability. To increase the surface area of the structural electrodes, several methods have been employed, mainly consisting in the modification of the surface of the carbon fiber itself, or by coating the carbon fiber through a material which covers its entire surface area.

Physical and chemical activation of the carbon fibers have increased their specific surface area by two orders of magnitude without damaging their mechanical properties, but have limited energy storage ability when combined with a structural polymer electrolyte. Coating carbon fibers with carbon nanotubes, carbon aerogel, or graphene nanoplatelets allowed for higher energy densities.
