= Piezoelectrochemical transducer effect =

Coupling between strain and electric potential

The piezoelectrochemical transducer effect (PECT) is a coupling between the electrochemical potential and the mechanical strain in ion-insertion-based electrode materials. It is similar to the piezoelectric effect – with both exhibiting a voltage-strain coupling - although the PECT effect relies on movement of ions within a material microstructure, rather than charge accumulation from the polarization of electric dipole moments.

Many different materials have been shown to exhibit a PECT effect including: lithiated graphite.; carbon fibers inserted with lithium, sodium, and potassium; sodiated black phosphorus; lithiated aluminium; lithium cobalt oxide; vanadium oxide nanofibers inserted with lithium and sodium; and lithiated silicon.

These materials all exhibit a voltage-strain coupling, whereby the material expands when it is charged with ions, and contracts when it is discharged. The reverse is also true: when applying a mechanical strain the electrical potential changes.

This has led to various proposals of applications for the PECT effect with research focusing on actuators, strain-sensors, and energy harvesters.

== Origins ==
The PECT effect was first reported by Dr. F Lincoln Vogel in 1981 when studying how intercalation voltages could be used to provide an actuation force in graphitized carbon fibres. The research used sulphate (SO_{4}) ions from sulfuric acid to intercalate into the microstructure of carbon fibers, forming graphite intercalation compounds (GICs). It was hypothesized that an axial strain of up to 2% should be possible, however only 0.2% was observed due to experimental limitations.

The effect is often explained by the theories of Larché and Cahn who derived mathematical formulations for the equilibrium relationships between the electric potential, chemical potential, and mechanical stress in solid materials. In summary the theory states that solid materials under mechanical stress undergo a change in chemical potential, which in turn affects their electrical potential.

== Applications ==
=== Actuation ===
Since PECT materials expand and contract upon ion-insertion it is possible to use this effect for actuation. Several different materials have been proposed for this, including: carbon fibers inserted with lithium, sodium, and potassium; lithium cobalt oxide; and vanadium oxide nanofibers inserted with lithium and sodium. Applications for PECT-based actuation range from microelectromechanical systems (MEMS), to large morphing structures.

Different materials exhibit different amounts of expansion/contraction, with a response that is dependent on the type of ion, as well as the amount of charge. For example, silicon expands by more than 300% when inserted with lithium, whereas graphite expands by around 13%. Carbon fibres expand by up to 1% when inserted with lithium, but only around 0.2% when inserted with potassium.

=== Strain-sensing ===
As PECT materials exhibit a change in voltage upon application of strain, it is possible to calibrate this change in voltage to the level of strain in a material. This has been proposed for applications in battery health monitoring, as well as structural health monitoring.

=== Electricity production ===
When mechanical strain is applied to a PECT material it changes the chemical potential, and therefore the electric potential of that material. Since current flows from more negative materials to more positive materials, it is possible to induce a current flow between two ionically connected materials by simply applying a mechanical strain. It is therefore possible to harness and convert mechanical energy into electrical energy.

A number of materials have been demonstrated to be capable of PECT-based energy harvesting, including: carbon fibers inserted with lithium, sodiated black phosphorus; lithiated aluminium; and lithiated silicon. A structural carbon fibre composite has also been shown to be capable of harvesting energy using the PECT effect. Conventional lithium-ion batteries have also been shown to be capable of PECT-based energy harvesting.

This effect has most often been demonstrated using a two-electrode bending setup:

1. Two electrodes of the same material are connected ionically through an electrolyte, and electrically via an outer circuit.
2. A bending deformation is applied causing tension in one electrode and compression in the other.
3. The resulting change in chemical potential results in current flow in the outer circuit, which can be used to power an external device.

PECT energy harvesting is limited by the rate of ionic diffusion, and therefore is only efficient at low frequency (typically below around 1 Hz).

Figures of merit for comparing different PECT-based energy harvesters were formulated by Preimesberger et al.

== Implications for batteries ==
The PECT effect is also present in typical ion-insertion-based battery electrodes (e.g. Li-ion). The electrodes expand and contract when inserted with ions, which is one of the issues that leads to battery ageing and capacity loss over time. The PECT effect in battery electrodes could be an issue in situations where battery electrodes are mechanically stressed (e.g. in structural batteries), causing a change in electrical potential when the stress-state changes.

It has been proposed that the PECT effect in Li-ion batteries could be exploited to measure battery health., and to harvest mechanical energy.
