= Structural battery =

Battery that serves a structural function

Structural batteries are multifunctional materials or structures, capable of acting as an electrochemical energy storage system (i.e. batteries) while possessing mechanical integrity.

They help save weight and are useful in transport applications such as electric vehicles and drones, because of their potential to improve system efficiencies. Two main types of structural batteries can be distinguished: embedded batteries and laminated structural electrodes.

== Embedded batteries ==
Embedded batteries represent multifunctional structures where lithium-ion battery cells are efficiently embedded into a composite structure, and more often sandwich structures. In a sandwich design, state-of-the-art lithium-ion batteries are embedded forming a core material and bonded in between two thin and strong face sheets (e.g. aluminium). In-plane and bending loads are carried by face sheets while the battery core takes up transverse shear and compression loads as well as storing the electrical energy. The multifunctional structure can then be used as a load-bearing as well as an energy storage material.

== Laminated structural electrodes ==
In laminated structural electrodes the electrode material possesses an intrinsic load-bearing and energy storage function. Such batteries are also called massless batteries, since in theory vehicle body parts could also store energy thus not adding any additional weight to the vehicle as additional batteries would not be needed. An example for such batteries are those based on a zinc anode, manganeseoxide cathode and a fiber/ polymer composite electrolyte. The structural electrolyte enables stable charge and discharge performance. This assembly has been demonstrated in an unmanned aerial vehicle. A commonly proposed structural battery is based on a carbon fiber reinforced polymer (CFRP) concept. Here, carbon fibers serve simultaneously as electrodes and structural reinforcement. The lamina is composed of carbon fibers that are embedded in a matrix material (e.g. a polymer). Multiple layers of carbon fibers are impregnated with a matrix that enables load transfer between the fibers but also lithium-ion transport, unlike commonly used vinylester or epoxy matrices. This type of energy storage system can be based on a nickel or on lithium-ion chemistry. The laminate is made of the combination of a negative electrode, a separator and a positive electrode, embedded in an ionically conductive and structural electrolyte. In the laminated structural electrodes concept, carbon fibers can be used to intercalate e.g. lithium-ions (structural anode); similarly, to commercially available graphite anodes. The structural cathode consists of carbon fibers coated with electrochemically active species, e.g. lithium oxide particles. An example of a structural battery exploiting a carbon fiber negative electrode and lithium iron phosphate positive electrode was demonstrated to be capable of lighting an LED. Some separator material is used in between the two structural electrodes to prevent short-circuits. However, the CFRC concept described above is still being researched.

== Construction ==
CTM (Cell-to-Module), CTP (Cell-to-Pack), CTB (Cell-to-Body), CTC (Cell-to-Chassis), CTV (Cell-to-Vehicle)

== See also ==
- Structural Battery Composites
