= Artistic integrity =

Artistic integrity is generally defined as the ability to omit an acceptable level of opposing, disrupting, and corrupting values that would otherwise alter an artist's or entities’ original vision in a manner that violates their own preconceived aesthetic standards and personal values. It is someone's (the one who has artistic integrity) high artistic standards or standards of doing their job, and that person's determination not to lower those standards. This does not necessitate that an artist needs to ignore external influences in the creation process. It is often academically studied under the greater umbrella of personal integrity, but recent papers have shown the need for its own standards and studies given the wide usage of the concept in critique of contemporary art alongside the continued governmental investment. The definition itself can take on many forms and has been argued about academically due to the nuanced nature of Artistic Integrity's overlap with non-artistic forms of integrity and the differing values in philosophical frameworks both by artists and the larger community. Despite the widespread use of the concept in mass media and the creative industry; artistic integrity has often been philosophically ignored in comparison to personal and mechanical integrity. An important factor to consider in discussion of artistic integrity is context in terms of not only the historical zeitgeist but more prominently the community and artists’ respective cultural and personal understanding of the term. If an individual is said to possess artistic integrity it does not equate to that person also possessing personal integrity; correspondingly, the absence of personal integrity does not equate to the absence of artistic integrity.

== History ==
Romantic Movement
- 1700–1848
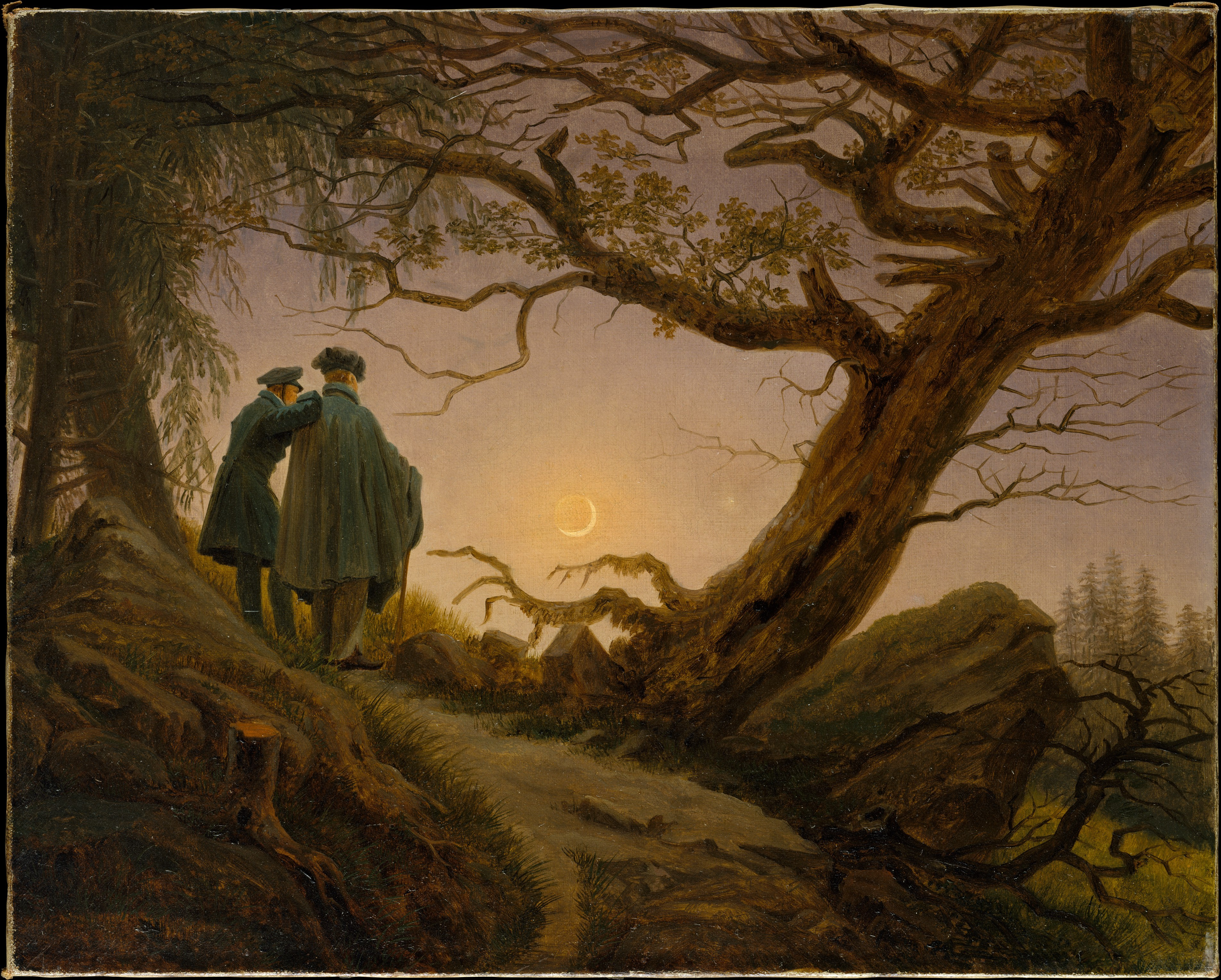
- Two Men Contemplating the Moon by German Romantic Caspar David Friedrich 1825

The philosophical concept of artistic integrity can be traced back to the development of the Romantic Movement of the late 17th and early 18th century alongside a link to the increased idealization of artists. This is argued to be the jumping point for the concept itself and showed that it is applied differently depending on which artistic movement it is mentioned. The romantic movement also brought about differentiation of artists from other tradespersons into revered byronic geniuses; this ‘artistic genius’ concept is closely related to the said artist maintaining artistic integrity in the eyes of his contemporaries to protect his/her genius status in front of increased public scrutiny that comes with the recognition.

At the same time as the romantic movement; there was an economic shift to capitalism, the economic impact altered the way artists earned a living that ultimately resulted in the emergence of art markets and subsequent industrialization. In the 1940s theorists began discussion of these art markets in context of an umbrella term coined “Culture Industries”. Their approach has been critiqued for focusing too much on art's economic value while overlooking artistic and social values. The prevalence of these theories and the continued impact of mass commercialization lead to a clash between the romantic perception of artists and their economic principles. This is perhaps is where the ‘myth of the tortured artist’ conflicted with the economics of capitalism resulting in the widespread idea that artists can have integrity if they do not commercialize their art or are financially successful.

This conflict within academia about artistic integrity continued throughout the 1960s where the Soviet graphic artist Vladimir Favorsky measured and defined artistic integrity according to how much a work of art showcased the time investment an artist dedicated to a piece. He argued that to do so would require artists to forgo their persona entirely and be undistractedly immersed in the artwork itself. Thus, linking time investment as a primary measure of artistic integrity.

To resolve some of the issues of ‘industrializing’ art; the art marketing discipline emerged philosophically and practically. Eventually leading to the development of the first model of creative orientations by Elizabeth Hirschman which assisted in providing a framework for academics to view artistic integrity.

Over time the art markets saw a shift from old elitist views of `high` art to more accessible niche forms like the ‘underground’ music scene which are viewed to be purer representations of artistic integrity than popular music due to its relative lack of profitability. This is also exemplified in film as well where contemporaries view directors who participate in niche film festivals as being more authentic resulting in a view that they have more artistic integrity than those who create for a mainstream audience.

The last two to three decades showed increased public and art community interest in artistic integrity due to the increasing commercial success of certain artforms like film and music alongside additional questioning of aesthetic value due to the politicization and investment of the art industry with this lucrative expectation of monetary benefits.

== Frameworks ==
=== Elizabeth Hirschman (Creative Orientations) ===
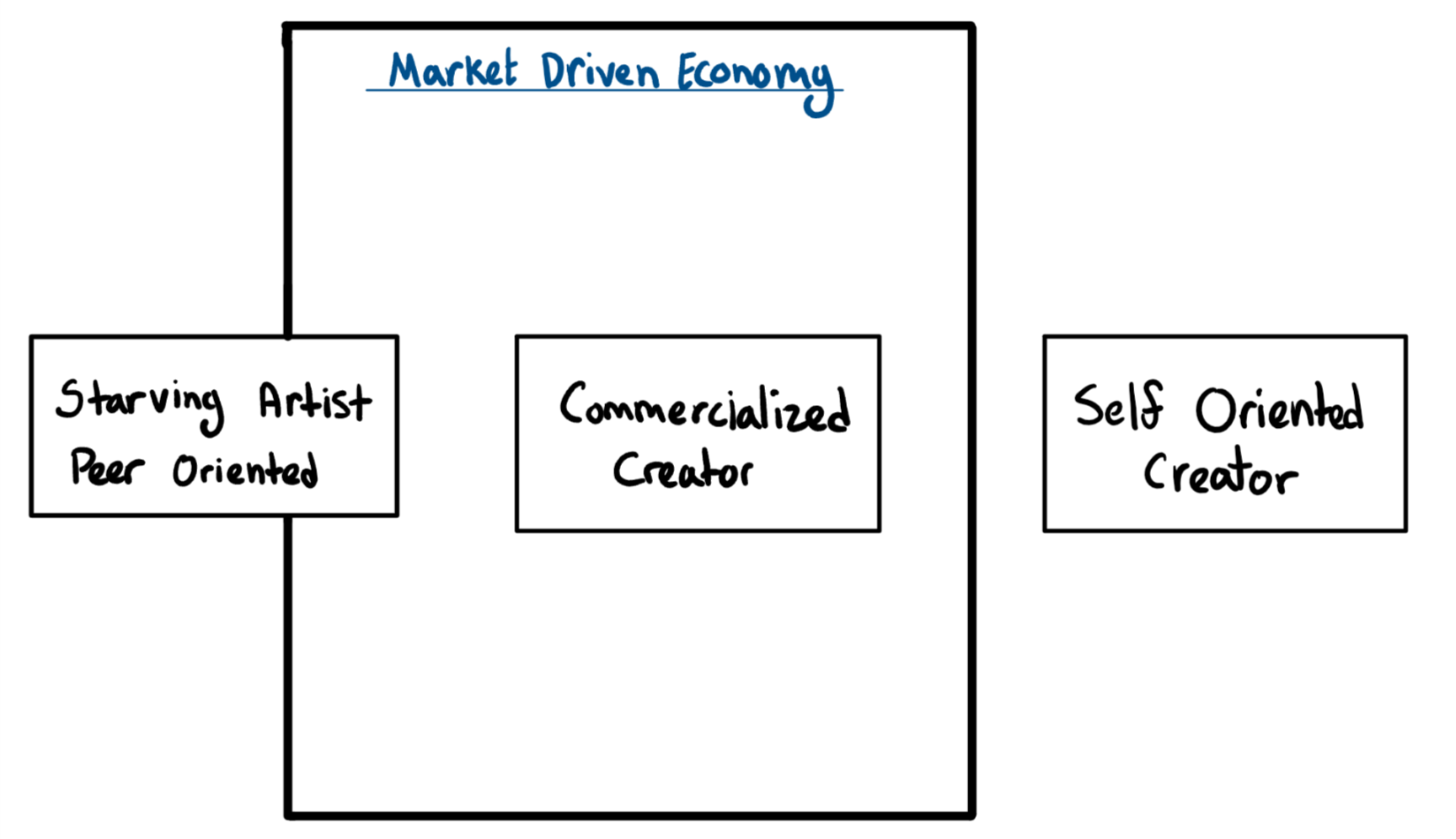
Creative Orientations in market driven economy

Her ‘’creative orientations’’ model has been used to help contextualize Artistic Integrity in academia

There are three main creative orientations that cohabit the art industry:

	Primary Audience	Primary Objective
Self	Self	Self Expression
Peer	Peers and Industry Professionals	Recognition and Acclaim
Commercial	The public-at-large	Money

Economic benefits may inadvertently arise for the first two orientations; however, it is not the reason for creation. Participants may work in any combination of the three orientations; where they can create for themselves, other artists, or purely for commercial reasons

Self-orientated creators set their own internal standards of their art above everyone else's even if it means risking potential monetary loss and social backlash.

Peer-oriented creators also value artistic integrity over financial gain, but creative industry peer opinion is the focus. Hirschman comments that these creative enterprises advocate artistic integrity as the industry norm; the methodology of ensuring that these expectations are met is through peer evaluation.

Commercial-oriented creators focus on monetary gains throughout the creative process. This financial orientation has led to this orientation being the most controversial as it reflects the creative industry through critiques of damaging artistic integrity due to its marketing focused nature. The expectation of this market centric approach is that profitability and widespread exposure will follow through marketing principles; however, this is believed among artists and consumers alike to rely heavily on an exchange of artistic integrity for exposure. This is known as ‘selling out’ and is usually considered to hold a negative connotation of the artist's quality of work.

=== Autonomism ===
Under autonomism it is presumed that art itself has no association to other forms of reality and thus cannot be judged as anything other than freedom of expression which in turn omits art from being morally and even cognitively evaluated making artistic integrity a void concept.

=== Claudia Mill’s Spectrum ===
1. The artist makes no conscious effort to profit or receive recognition off his/her works both during creation and after completion. This is the clearest case of an artist having artistic integrity
2. The artist desires to meet basic monetary requirements and some level of recognition, but it has no effect on the creative process and creation.
3. The artist initially makes conscious effort in choice of genre hoping to achieve monetary and social benefits. After making this initial decision the artist then works exclusively to the selected work with disregard to anything unrelated
4. The artist not only considers the monetary and social benefits while choosing the medium in which to create but also during the creative process.
5. The artist either chooses the medium or produces the artwork in a manner that he/she consciously tarnishes its artistic qualities. This is the clearest case of an artist lacking artistic integrity

== Artist perception ==
The complex history and lack of variety in study of artistic integrity is reflected by the multifurcation of artist perception on artistic integrity. From interviews conducted under academia common features emerged that involved the importance of artistic integrity to creators and the presence of an internal framework in which they defined it; contextually, to their perception of what they expected of themselves and what the public perception was within their personal ideology. Interpretations and general definitions of artistic integrity however differed radically from artist to artist and sometimes were considered contradictory. These findings brought into question the validity of the modern usage of the term itself; arguing for more representation of artists to define the legitimacy and connotations of their own integrity.

== In literary translation ==
Artistic Integrity pertains to the end translation being “a version that presents, in the target-language environment, a message to the reader as close as possible to the original message in the eyes of the source-language reader”. As word for word translation is seldom applicable it is expected that the translator attempts to maintain each feature of the initial text (within mathematical limits of perfect translation) through factual adjustments to maintain the artistic integrity of the original text. It's heavily stressed that this does not equate to the translator disregarding literary facts in translation but rather that these omissions are only made to preserve artistic integrity when necessary as otherwise the whole original message would be lost in translation. Artistic Integrity is not only concerned with the words alone but the soul of the text in that it considers meaning on more levels than just literal; it also considers imagery, logos of target text, and overtones that could contribute as much as literal wordings of the source language.

The artistic integrity approach to translation revolves around four processes: penetration, acquisition, transition, and presentation.

1. Penetration into the setting in which the original text was made for the source language audience. The linguistic and cultural milieu where the message was meant to be received.
2. Acquisition of the message, including the spirit, the substance and the flavor which can only be fully comprehended and appreciated by readers who share the language and culture of the original.
3. Transition from what has taken shape in the translator's mind as the original message in the source-language environment is transformed into a new message in the target-language environment.
4. Presentation of the newly formed message in terms that preserve the artistic integrity of the text and produce on target-language readers an effect that approximates as closely as possible the effect that the original message produces on source language readers.

== Politics ==
Many first world countries have identified the importance of art involvement in the wellbeing of its economy and communities; prompting public funding of art initiatives and policies. These include investment into higher arts education in hopes to boost financial viability of the arts industry while maintaining the ‘culturally specific’ nature of the artforms. Some examples of countries that employ taxpayer investment into these creative industries are Australia, New Zealand, Canada, Ireland and Finland

== Controversies ==
=== Adventures of Huckleberry Finn ===
The 1884 novel has been a subject of controversy due to its mention of the word nigger 219 times. The primary discourse revolves around its use in the American education system where one side argues that it should be taught using a censored version or not at all while the other side thinks that censoring the work leads to the loss of its artistic integrity as some literary interpretations show the use of the word was not to promote racism but rather to discredit it. The edited versions of the novel that use the word slave instead are seen to have lost artistic integrity of the original text; however, some teachers and students feel burdened by saying such a derogatory word.

=== Jane Austen ===
In an 1816 letter by James Stanier Clarke; the librarian at His Royal Highness's Coburg House, it was suggested that Jane writes a historical romance set in that house as it would have been politically advantageous to the Prince and profitable to Jane herself. Her memoir later revealed that she rejected his suggestion as she acknowledged it would be popular and profitable but that it would clash with her style to the point that she would theoretically hang herself before writing a chapter of the suggested book.

=== Sex Pistols ===
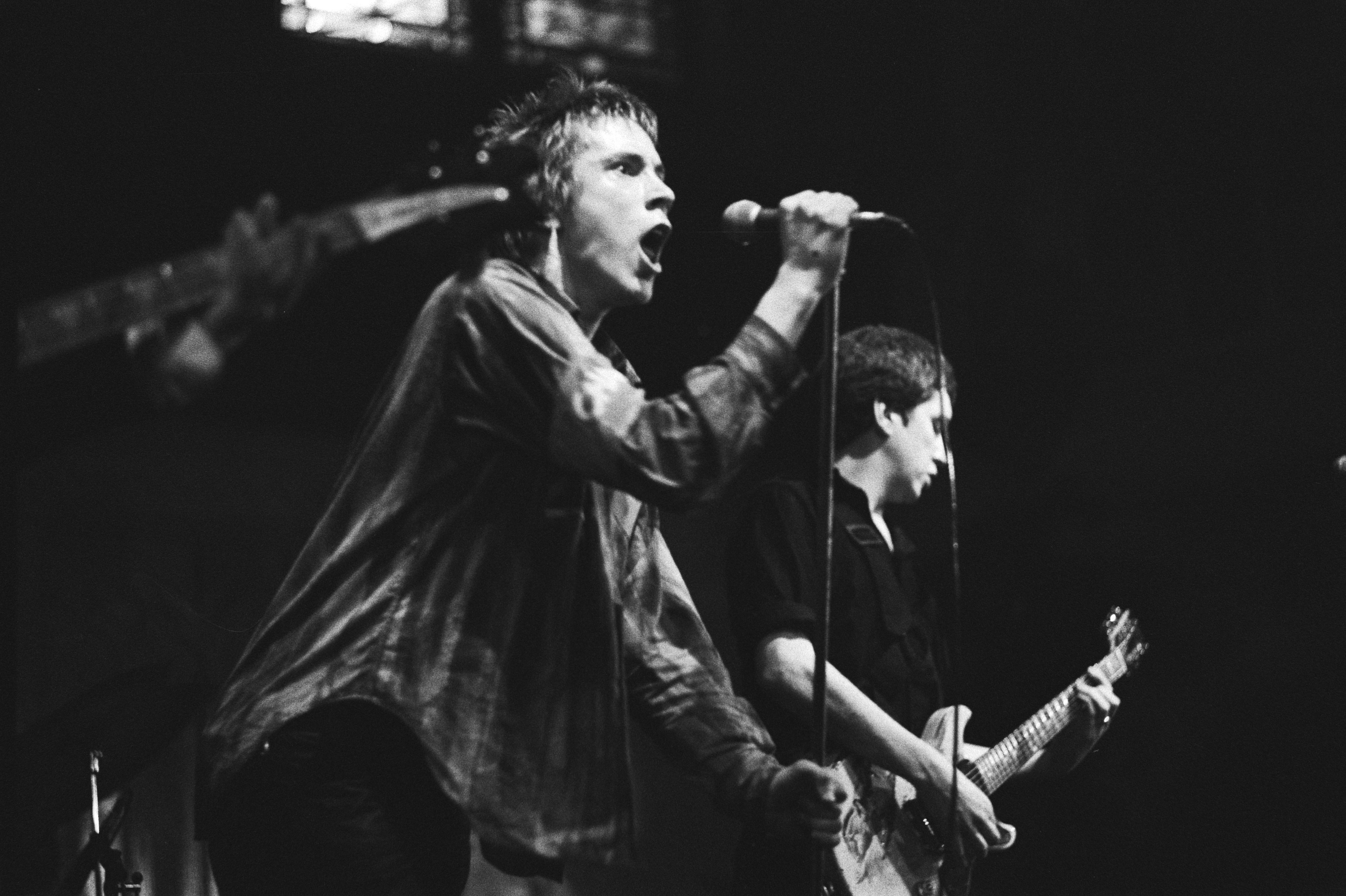
Johnny Rotten and guitarist Steve Jones of the UK band Sex Pistols

The 2006 article Sex Pistols sell out discussed the controversy around punk band Sex Pistols signing away ownership of their music to Universal Music Publishing Group which will exploit their music through advertisements and other commercial venues. The writer of the article expressed disgust at the lack of artistic integrity brought about by this decision. Comments around this article also argued that the Sex Pistols discography has always built them as artists who care about nothing but themselves and that maybe their followers should not be shocked at this action as it seems that it is in line with the band's own sense of artistic integrity. This is a contemporary example of artists having a different sense of artistic integrity than the public's and that contextually ‘selling out’ is entirely within the confounds of their artistic integrity.
