= Akio Shindo =

- Born: 1926
- Died: October 31, 2016
- Occupation: Carbon scientist

Akio Shindo (進藤昭男, Shindō Akio; 1926 – October 31, 2016) was a Japanese scientist, known as the inventor responsible for the process used in the production of modern carbon fibers.

== History ==
Shindo is credited with inventing polyacrylonitrile (PAN) carbon fiber while working at the Government Industrial Research Institute (GIRIO), Osaka, Japan. Shindo joined GIRIO in 1952, assigned to work in their carbon laboratory.

Starting in 1956, research had been done in the USA on carbon fibers using rayon as the raw material, with Union Carbide having some success with the product. Shindo became aware of the American research after reading a newspaper article about the discovery, but "spotted an opportunity the American researchers had dismissed: polyacrylonitrile (PAN), a synthetic polymer that had proved difficult to work with." Five months later, he'd developed a working process, studying the use of polyacrylonitrile instead of rayon in the manufacture of carbon fiber. A patent was filed for the PAN carbon fiber product in September 1959, with the research presented at a conference in October 1959. The research was further boosted in 1965 when US military personnel became interested in Shinda's invention, pushing the product towards use as a structural material. The WIPO has noted the 1959 patent "reshape an entire industry for generations", with PAN carbon fibers widely used around the world. They note: "Dr. Shindo's patent is a textbook example of how research IP can catalyze an entire industry. The patent disclosure made the breakthrough visible, while the licensing strategy made it transferable and commercially viable. And the result — PAN-based carbon fiber composites — now underpins everything from commercial aviation to sustainable energy storage."

While the inventor of an important technology, some have called it "a pity" that there is nothing to commemorate Shindo in Osaka.

== Legacy ==
Starting in 2019, the Society for the Advancement of Material and Process Engineering (SAMPE), has awarded the Shindo Award to carbon fiber scientists, named after Akio Shindo in recognition of his contribution to the field of carbon fiber materials.

== Personal life ==
Shinda was married to Chiyoko. He died on October 31, 2016, aged 90.
