= Integrity engineering audit =

An Integrity Engineering Audit is carried out within an Integrity engineering function so as to ensure compliance with international, national and company specific standards and regulations.

It is carried out in order to prove that the system is compliant, transparent, effective and efficient. API Recommended Practice 580, Risk-Based Inspection (see American Petroleum Institute) outlines such an audit as part of a Risk Based Inspection program. It checks that the most efficient and cost effective implementation of inspections and integrity management programs are being carried out. It ensures that the integrity of plant facilities including all onshore and offshore structures and pipelines, stationary equipment, piping systems are being correctly addressed. It checks and ensures that the Integrity Engineer has identified, investigated and assessed all deterioration/corrosion as well as timely maintenance of the affected facilities. It audits the Inspection and Corrosion Control Policy and Risk Based Inspection (RBI) methods which manage the integrity and checks that the optimum inspection frequency, maintenance cost and plant availability are being met. It may be approached under a generic framework such as ISO 19011 on the basis of a technical audit without formal documentation, but with a regulatory or statutory criteria.
