= Roger Bacon (physicist) =

American physicist and inventor (1926-2007)

- Born: April 16, 1926; Cleveland, Ohio, United States
- Died: January 26, 2007; Oberlin, Ohio, United States
- Occupation(s): Physicist, inventor
- Children: 2

Roger Bacon (April 16, 1926 – January 26, 2007) was an American physicist and inventor at the Parma Technical Center of National Carbon Company in suburban Cleveland, Ohio, where he invented graphite fibers in 1958.

Bacon was trying to measure the triple point of carbon—the temperature and pressure where solid, liquid and gas are in thermodynamic equilibrium—in a direct-current carbon arc furnace when he noticed stalagmite-like filaments growing from the vapor phase at lower pressures on the negative electrode. The condensate was embedded with flexible graphite whiskers as much as 5 μm in diameter and 3 cm long. Bacon estimated the production cost of the whiskers at the time as $10 million per pound.

After more than a year of research on the fibers, Bacon published his results. The fibers were characterized as scrolled sheets of graphite where the crystallographic c-axis was exactly perpendicular to the cylindrical axis. The fiber cylinders had either a circular or elliptical cross-section. The fibers were not actually single crystals, but behaved as single crystals along the filament axis. The fibers were grown in an atmosphere of argon, pressure = 92 atm and temperature = 3900K. The tensile strength, elastic modulus and room-temperature resistivity were as much as 2000 kg/mm^{2} (19,600 MPa), 7 trillion dyne/cm^{2} (700 GPa) and 65 μΩ·cm, all comparable to the single-crystal values. The triple-point of carbon was confirmed as approximately 100 atm and 3900 K. The strength and modulus for the best steels are typically 2000 MPa and 200 GPa, resp.

Invention of the carbon nanotube is credited to Sumio Iijima in 1991, but Figure 8 in Bacon's paper shows a carbon nanotube derived from a whisker subjected to heavy current that caused the outer layers to explode. Iijima's invention is a seamless tube of diameter <30 nm, as opposed to Bacon's scrolled sheet.

Bacon won several awards for his invention, including honors from the Franklin Institute in 2004 and the University of Delaware. He was inducted into the National Inventors Hall of Fame in 2016. In 2003, the American Chemical Society recognized the development of carbon fibers as a National Historic Chemical Landmark.

Bacon was born in Cleveland on April 16, 1926. He earned a bachelor's degree at Haverford College in 1951 and a Ph.D. in solid-state physics at Case Institute of Technology in 1955. Bacon worked for National Carbon, a subsidiary of Union Carbide, from 1956 to 1986, and Amoco Polymers Group from 1986 until his retirement in 1998. He also taught physics at Baldwin Wallace College in Berea, Ohio, from 1959 to 1971. He died of leukemia at his home in Oberlin, Ohio, on 26 January 2007, and was survived by his wife Agnes, two children and five grandchildren.
