= Multi-function structure =

Composite material that has load-carrying and other functions as well

A multi-function material is a composite material. The traditional approach to the development of structures is to address the load-carrying function and other functional requirements separately. Recently, however, there has been increased interest in the development of load-bearing materials and structures which have integral non-load-bearing functions, guided by recent discoveries about how multifunctional biological systems work.

== Introduction ==
With conventional structural materials, it has been difficult to achieve simultaneous improvement in multiple structural functions, but the increasing use of composite materials has been driven in part by the potential for such improvements. The multi-functions can vary from mechanical to electrical and thermal functions. The most widely used composites have polymer matrix materials, which are typically poor conductors. Enhanced conductivity could be achieved with reinforcing the composite with carbon nanotubes for instance.

== Functions ==
Among the many functions that can be attained are power transmission, electrical/thermal conductivity, sensing and actuation, energy harvesting/storage, self-healing capability, electromagnetic interference (EMI) shielding and recyclability and biodegradability. See also functionally graded materials which are composite materials where the composition or the microstructure are locally varied so that a certain variation of the local material properties is achieved. However, functionally graded materials can be designed for specific function and applications.

Many applications such as re-configurable aircraft wings, shape-changing aerodynamic panels for flow control, variable geometry engine exhausts, turbine blade, wind turbine configuration at different wind speed, microelectromechanical systems (micro-switches), mechanical memory cells, valves, micropumps, flexible direction panel position in solar cells, innovative architecture (adaptive shape panels for roofs and windows), flexible and foldable electronic devices and optics (shape changing mirrors for active focusing in adaptive optical systems).
