= Carbon fibers =

Material fibers about 5–10 μm in diameter composed of carbon

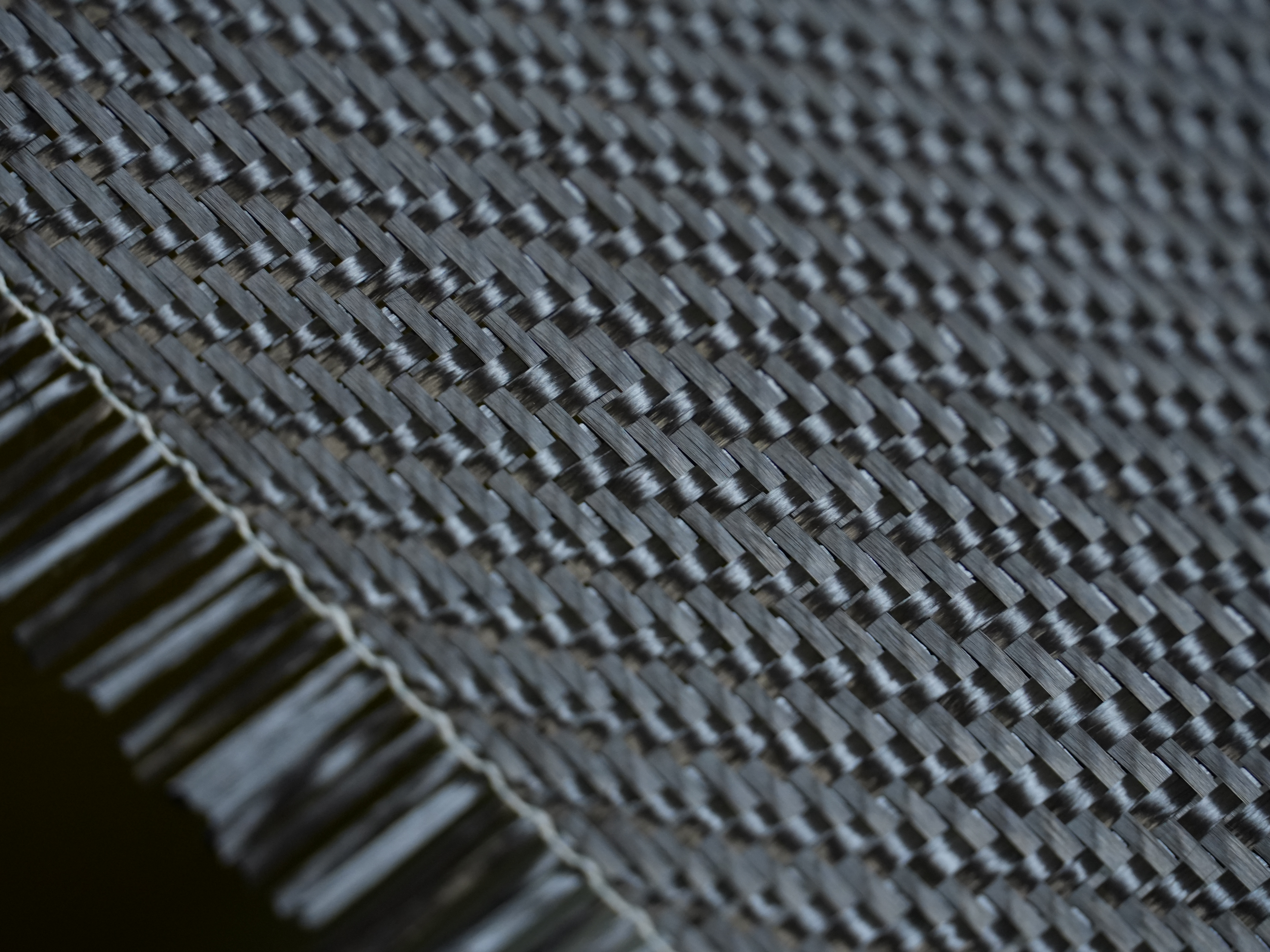
Fabric made of woven carbon filaments

Carbon fibers or carbon fibres (alternatively CF, graphite fiber or graphite fibre) are fibers about 5 to 10 micrometers (1/5000 to 1/2500 inch) in diameter and composed mostly of carbon atoms. Carbon fibers have several advantages: high stiffness, high tensile strength, high strength-to-weight ratio, high chemical resistance, high-temperature tolerance, and low thermal expansion. These properties have made carbon fiber very popular in aerospace, civil engineering, military, motorsport, and other competition sports. However, they are relatively expensive compared to similar fibers, such as glass fiber, basalt fibers, or plastic fibers.

To produce a carbon fiber, the carbon atoms are bonded together in crystals that are more-or-less aligned parallel to the fiber's long axis, as the crystal alignment gives the fiber a high strength-to-volume ratio (which is to say, the fiber is strong for its size). Several thousand carbon fibers are bundled together to form a tow, which may be used by itself or woven into a fabric.

Carbon fibers are usually combined with other materials to form a composite. For example, when permeated with a plastic resin and baked, it forms carbon-fiber-reinforced polymer (often referred to as carbon fiber), which has a very high strength-to-weight ratio and is extremely rigid although somewhat brittle. Carbon fibers are also composited with other materials, such as graphite, to form reinforced carbon-carbon composites, which have a very high heat tolerance.

Carbon-fiber-reinforced materials are used to make aircraft and spacecraft parts, racing-car bodies, golf-club shafts, bicycle frames, camera tripods, fishing rods, automobile springs, sailboat masts, and many other components where light weight and high strength are needed.

== History ==
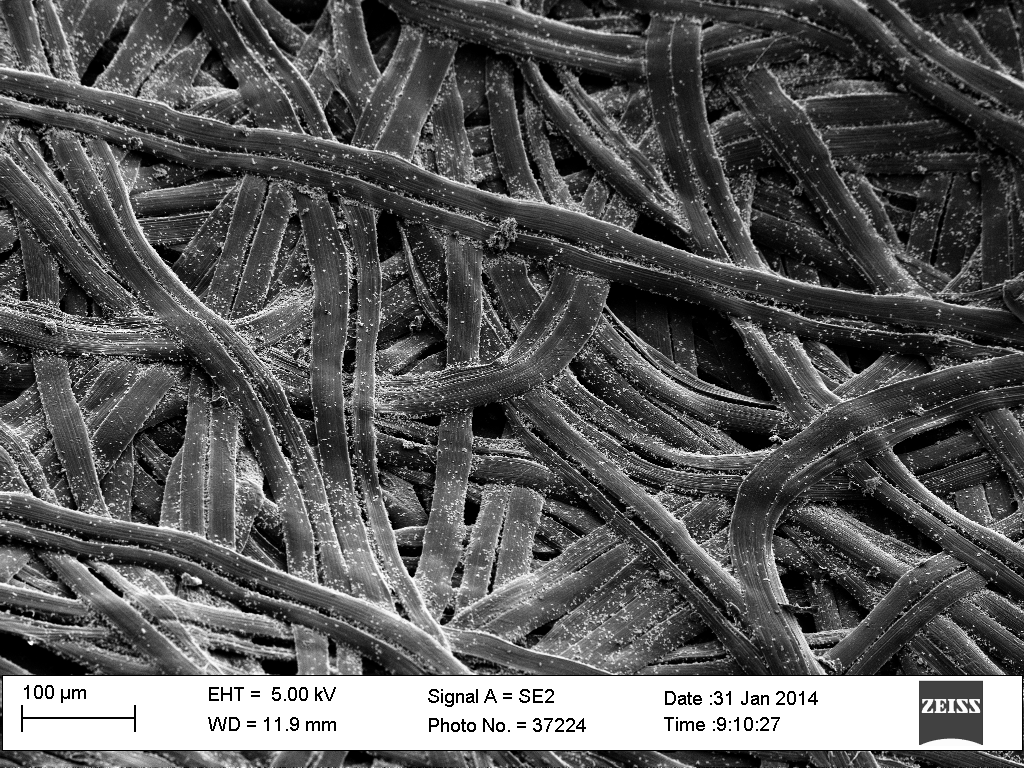
Carbon fibers produced by pyrolysis of a silk cocoon. Electron micrograph—scale bar at bottom left shows 100 μm.

In 1860, Joseph Swan produced carbon fibers for the first time, for use in light bulbs. In 1879, Thomas Edison baked cotton threads or bamboo slivers at high temperatures, carbonizing them into an all-carbon-fiber filament used in one of the first incandescent light bulbs to be heated by electricity. In 1880, Lewis Latimer developed a reliable carbon wire filament for the incandescent light bulb, heated by electricity.

In 1958, Roger Bacon created high-performance carbon fibers at the Union Carbide Parma Technical Center located outside of Cleveland, Ohio. Those fibers were manufactured by heating strands of rayon until they carbonized. This process proved to be inefficient, as the resulting fibers contained only about 20% carbon. In the early 1960s, a process was developed by Dr. Akio Shindo at Agency of Industrial Science and Technology of Japan, using polyacrylonitrile (PAN) as a raw material. This had produced a carbon fiber that contained about 55% carbon. In 1960 Richard Millington of H.I. Thompson Fiberglas Co. developed a process (U.S. patent 3,294,489) for producing a high-carbon-content (99%) fiber using rayon as a precursor. These carbon fibers had sufficient strength (modulus of elasticity and tensile strength) to be used as a reinforcement for composites having high strength-to-weight properties and for high-temperature-resistant applications.

The high potential strength of carbon fiber was realized in 1963 in a process developed by W. Watt, L. N. Phillips, and W. Johnson at the Royal Aircraft Establishment at Farnborough, Hampshire. The process was patented by the UK Ministry of Defence and licensed by the British National Research Development Corporation to three companies: Rolls-Royce, who were already making carbon fiber; Morganite; and Courtaulds. Within a few years, after successful use in 1968 of a Hyfil carbon-fiber fan assembly in the Rolls-Royce Conway jet engines of the Vickers VC10, Rolls-Royce took advantage of the new material's properties to break into the American market with its RB-211 aero-engine with carbon-fiber compressor blades. Unfortunately, the blades proved vulnerable to damage from bird impact. This problem and others caused Rolls-Royce such setbacks that the company was nationalized in 1971. The carbon-fiber production plant was sold off to form Bristol Composite Materials Engineering Ltd (often referred to as Bristol Composites).

In the late 1960s, the Japanese took the lead in manufacturing PAN-based carbon fibers. A 1970 joint technology agreement allowed Union Carbide to manufacture Japan's Toray Industries product. Morganite decided that carbon-fiber production was peripheral to its core business, leaving Courtaulds as the only big UK manufacturer. Courtaulds's water-based inorganic process made the product susceptible to impurities that did not affect the organic process used by other carbon-fiber manufacturers, leading Courtaulds ceasing carbon-fiber production in 1991.

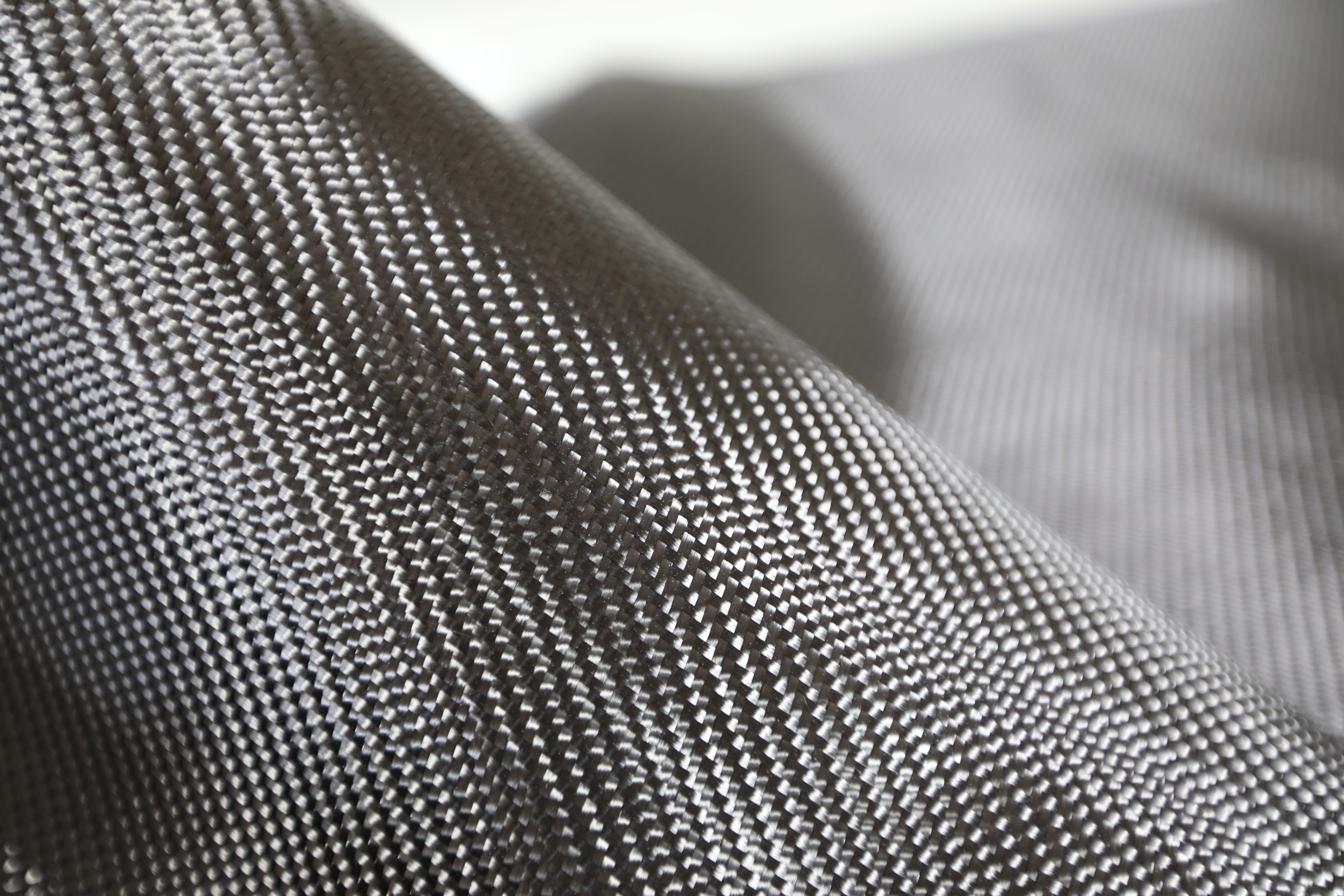
Ready-to-use carbon fiber sheet in the factory before molding

During the 1960s, experimental work to find alternative raw materials led to the introduction of carbon fibers made from a petroleum pitch derived from oil processing. These fibers contained about 85% carbon and had excellent flexural strength. Also, during this period, the Japanese Government heavily supported carbon-fiber development at home, and several Japanese companies such as Toray, Nippon Carbon, Toho Rayon, and Mitsubishi started their own development and production. Since the late 1970s, further types of carbon-fiber yarn entered the global market, offering higher tensile strength and higher elastic modulus, such as T400 from Toray with a tensile strength of 4,000 MPa and M40 with a modulus of 400 GPa. Intermediate carbon fibers, such as IM 600 from Toho Rayon with up to 6,000 MPa were developed. Carbon fibers from Toray, Celanese, and Akzo found their way to aerospace application from secondary to primary parts first in military and later in civil aircraft as in McDonnell Douglas, Boeing, Airbus, and United Aircraft Corporation planes. In 1988, Dr. Jacob Lahijani invented balanced ultra-high-Young's-modulus (greater than 690,000 MPa) and high-tensile-strength pitch carbon fiber (greater than 3,400 MPa) used extensively in automotive and aerospace applications. In March 2006, the patent was assigned to the University of Tennessee Research Foundation.

== Structure and properties ==
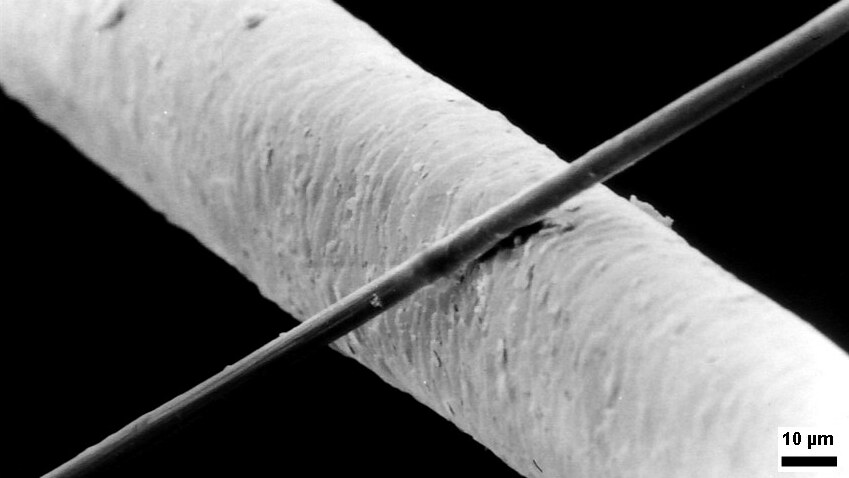
A 6-μm-diameter carbon filament (running from bottom left to top right) compared to a human hair

Carbon fiber is frequently supplied in the form of a continuous tow wound onto a reel. The tow is a bundle of thousands of continuous individual carbon filaments held together and protected by an organic coating, or size, such as polyethylene oxide (PEO) or polyvinyl alcohol (PVA). The tow can be conveniently unwound from the reel for use. Each carbon filament in the tow is a continuous cylinder with a diameter of 5–10 micrometers and consists almost exclusively of carbon. The earliest generation (e.g. T300, HTA and AS4) had diameters of 16–22 micrometers. Later fibers (e.g. IM6 or IM600) have diameters that are approximately 5 micrometers.

The atomic structure of carbon fiber is similar to that of graphite, consisting of sheets of carbon atoms arranged in a regular hexagonal pattern (graphene sheets), the difference being in the way these sheets interlock. Graphite is a crystalline material in which the sheets are stacked parallel to one another in regular fashion. The intermolecular forces between the sheets are relatively weak Van der Waals forces, giving graphite its soft and brittle characteristics.

Depending upon the precursor to make the fiber, carbon fiber may be turbostratic or graphitic, or have a hybrid structure with both graphitic and turbostratic parts present. In turbostratic carbon fiber, the sheets of carbon atoms are haphazardly folded, or crumpled, together. Carbon fibers derived from polyacrylonitrile (PAN) are turbostratic, whereas carbon fibers derived from mesophase pitch are graphitic after heat treatment at temperatures exceeding 2200 °C. Turbostratic carbon fibers tend to have high ultimate tensile strength, whereas heat-treated mesophase-pitch-derived carbon fibers have high Young's modulus (i.e., high stiffness or resistance to extension under load) and high thermal conductivity.

== Applications ==
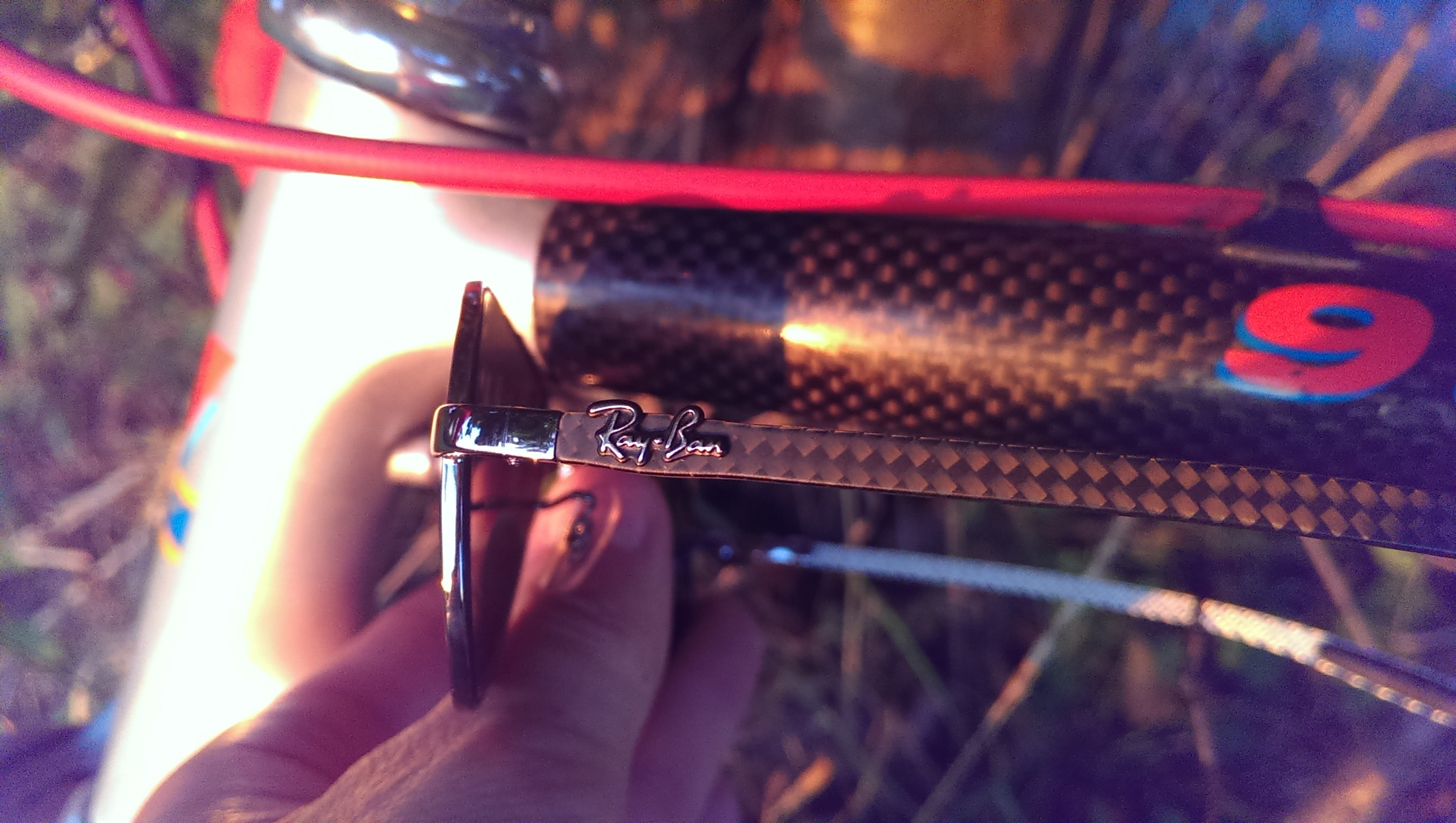
Carbon-fiber sunglasses temples and bicycle-frame tube

Carbon fiber can have higher cost than other materials, which has been one of the limiting factors of adoption. In a comparison between steel and carbon fiber materials for automotive materials, carbon fiber may be 10–12× more expensive. However, this cost premium has come down over the past decade from estimates of 35× more expensive than steel in the early 2000s.

=== Composite materials ===
Carbon fiber is most notably used to reinforce composite materials, particularly the class of materials known as carbon-fiber- or graphite-reinforced polymers. Non-polymer materials can also be used as the matrix for carbon fibers. Due to the formation of metal carbides and corrosion considerations, carbon has seen limited success in metal matrix composite applications. Reinforced carbon-carbon (RCC) consists of carbon-fiber-reinforced graphite, and is used structurally in high-temperature applications. The fiber also finds use in filtration of high-temperature gases, as an electrode with high surface area and impeccable corrosion resistance, and as an anti-static component. Molding a thin layer of carbon fibers significantly improves fire resistance of polymers or thermoset composites because a dense, compact layer of carbon fibers efficiently reflects heat.

The increasing use of carbon-fiber composites is displacing aluminum from aerospace applications in favor of other metals because of galvanic corrosion issues. However, carbon fiber does not eliminate the risk of galvanic corrosion. In contact with metal, it forms "a perfect galvanic corrosion cell ..., and the metal will be subjected to galvanic corrosion attack" unless a sealant is applied between the metal and the carbon fiber.

Carbon fiber can be used as an additive to asphalt to make electrically-conductive asphalt concrete. Using this composite material in transportation infrastructure, especially for airport pavement, decreases some winter maintenance problems that lead to flight cancellation or delay due to the presence of ice and snow. Passing current through the composite material's 3D network of carbon fibers dissipates thermal energy that increases the surface temperature of the asphalt, which is able to melt ice and snow above it.

=== Textiles ===
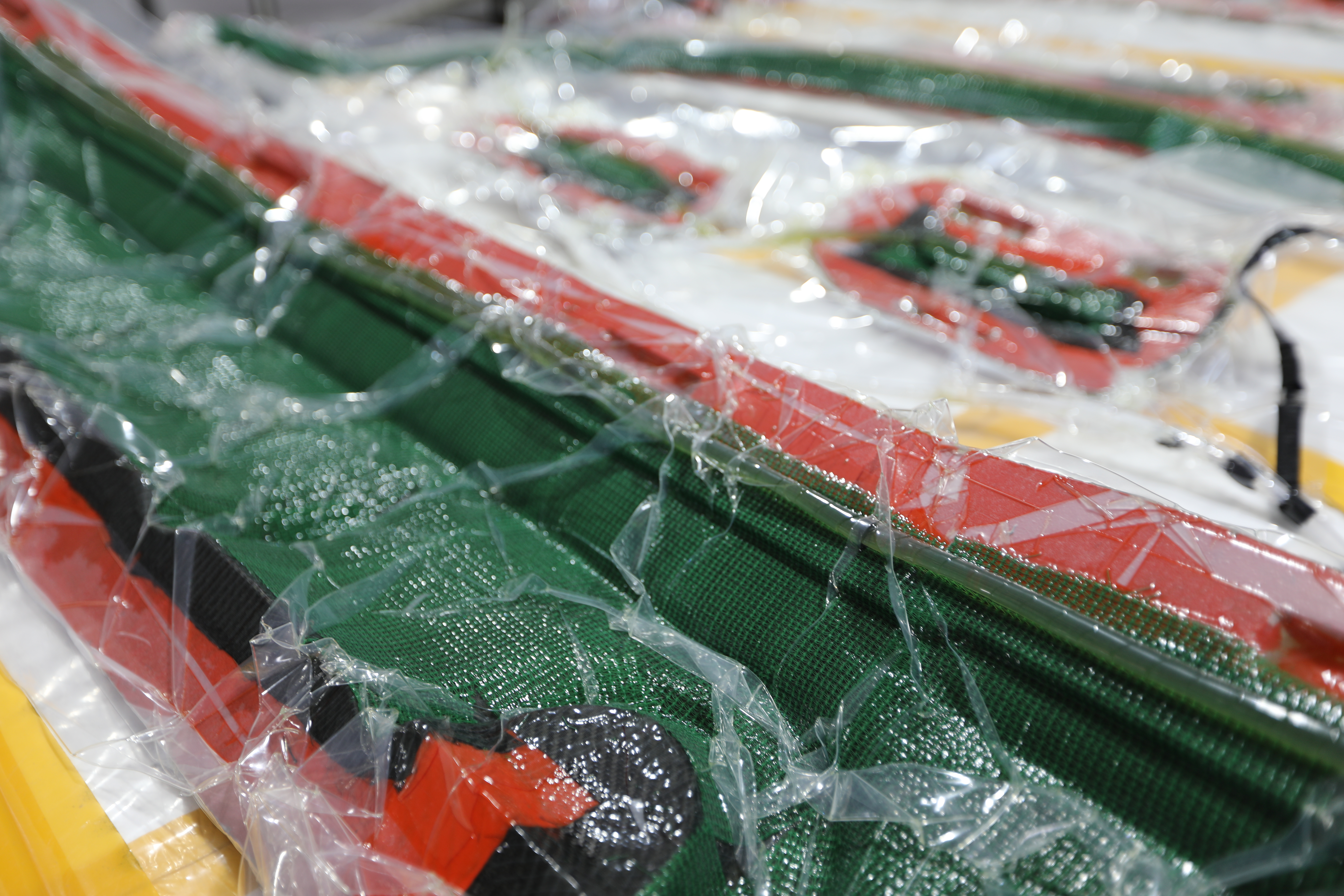
The look of the product before the heating process

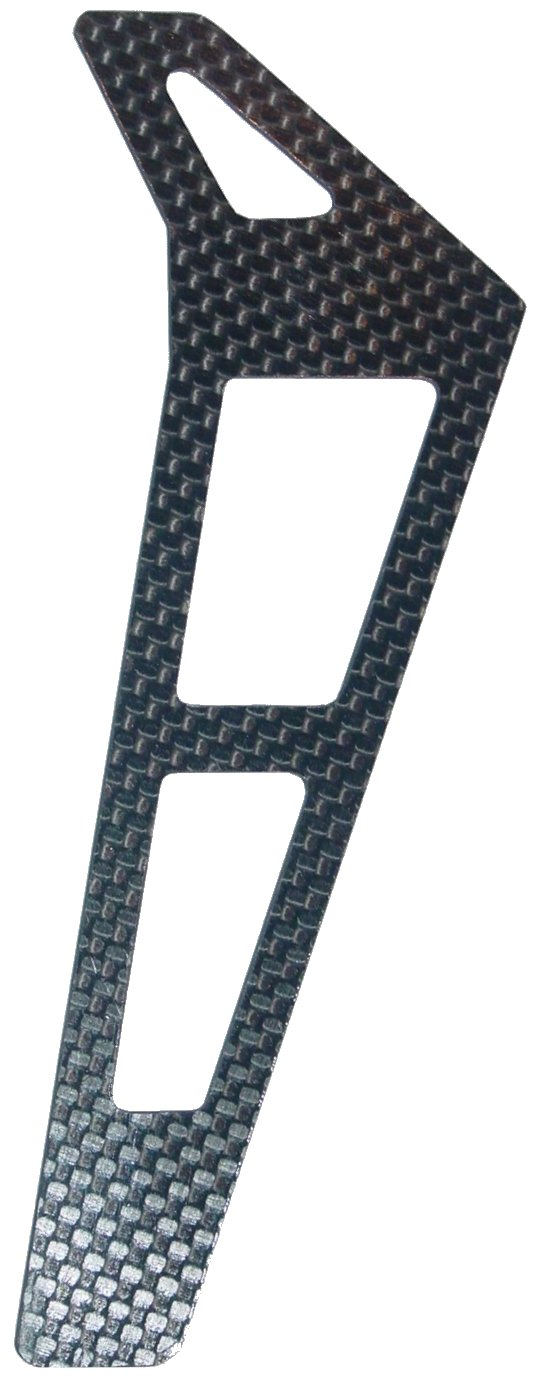
Tail of a radio-controlled helicopter, made of carbon fiber reinforced polymer

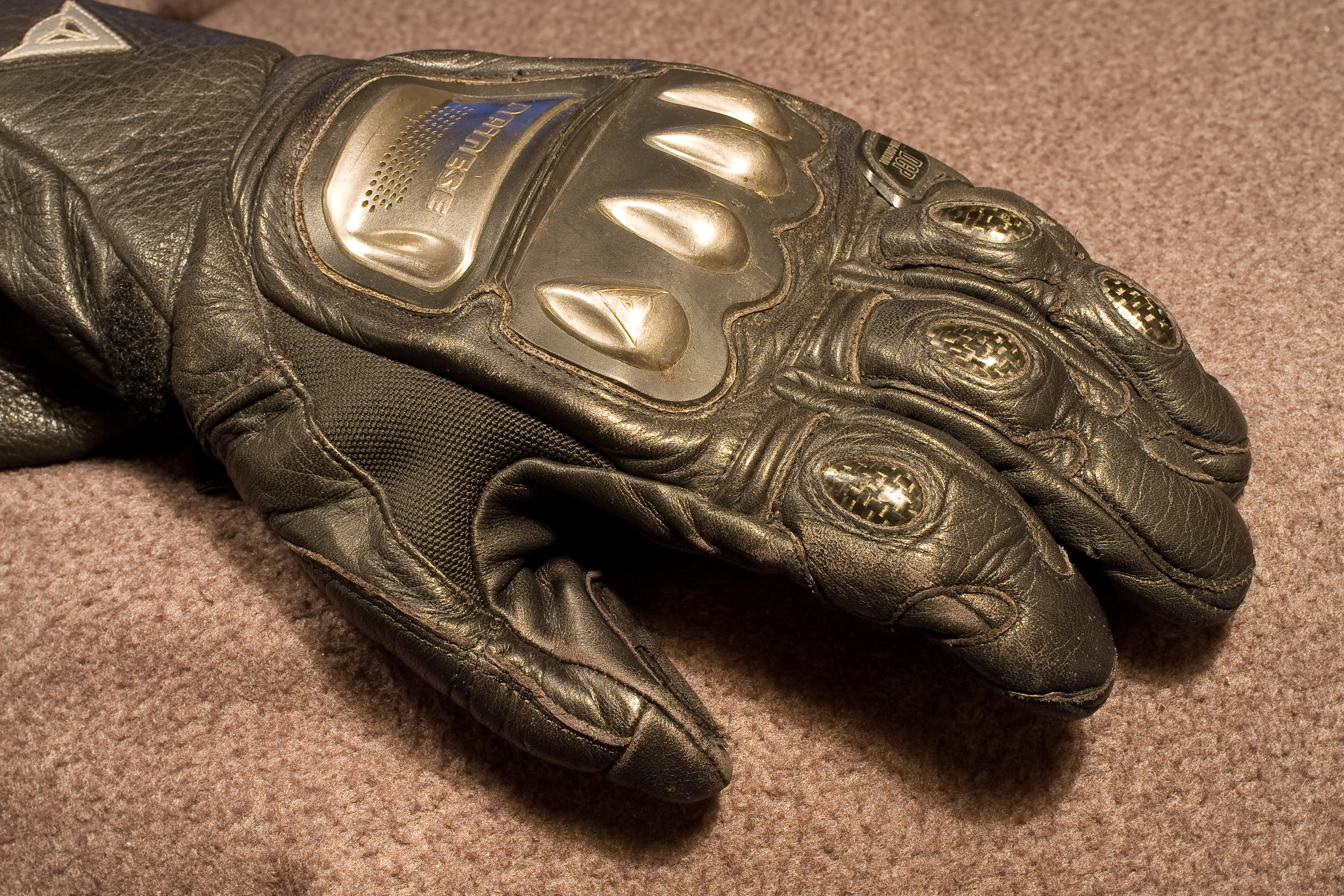
Motorcycle racing gloves with carbon-fiber protectors for ligaments in fingers

Precursors for carbon fibers are polyacrylonitrile (PAN), rayon, and pitch. Carbon-fiber filament yarns are used in several processing techniques: the direct uses are for prepregging, filament winding, pultrusion, weaving, braiding, etc. Carbon-fiber yarn is rated by its linear density (weight per unit length; i.e., 1 g/1000 m = 1 tex) or by number of filaments per yarn count, in thousands. For example, 200 tex for 3,000 filaments of carbon fiber is three times as strong as 1,000-carbon-filament yarn, but is also three times as heavy. This thread can then be used to weave a carbon-fiber-filament fabric or cloth. The appearance of this fabric generally depends on the linear density of the yarn and the weave chosen. Some commonly used types of weave are twill, satin, and plain. Carbon filament yarns can also be knitted or braided. Dry fabric carbon fiber composites (CFRP) are typically cut using CNC digital cutting systems equipped with rotating machine knives or ultrasonic cutters.

=== Microelectrodes ===
Carbon fibers are used for fabrication of carbon-fiber microelectrodes. In this application typically a single carbon fiber with diameter of 5–7 μm is sealed in a glass capillary. At the tip, the capillary is either sealed with epoxy and polished to make a carbon-fiber disk microelectrode, or the fiber is cut to a length of 75–150 μm to make a carbon-fiber cylinder electrode. Carbon-fiber microelectrodes are used either in amperometry or fast-scan cyclic voltammetry for detection of biochemical signaling.

=== Flexible heating ===
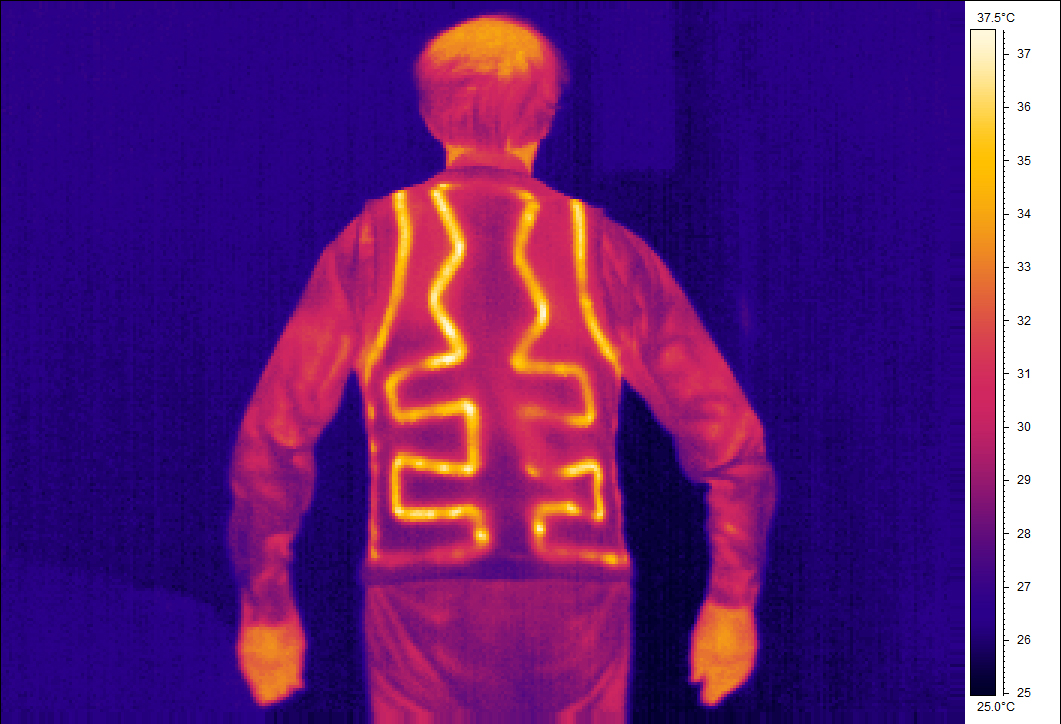
A DIY carbon-fiber-heated jacket

Despite being known for their electrical conductivity, carbon fibers can carry only very low currents on their own. When woven into larger fabrics, they can be used to reliably provide (infrared) heating in applications requiring flexible electrical heating elements and can easily sustain temperatures past 100 °C. Many examples of this type of application can be seen in DIY heated articles of clothing and blankets. Due to its chemical inertness, it can be used relatively safely amongst most fabrics and materials; however, shorts caused by the material folding back on itself will lead to increased heat production and can lead to a fire.

== Synthesis ==
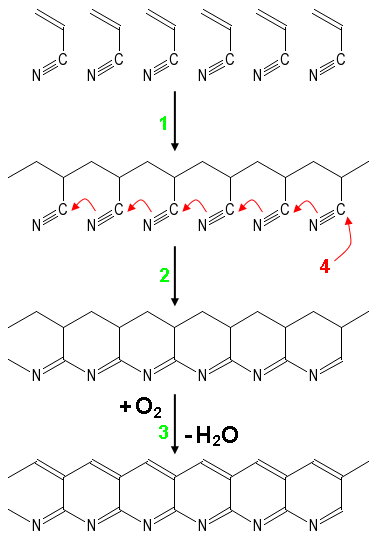
Synthesis of carbon fiber from polyacrylonitrile (PAN): 1. Polymerization of acrylonitrile to PAN, 2. Cyclization during the low-temperature process, 3. High-temperature oxidative treatment of carbonization (hydrogen is removed). After this process of graphitization starts where nitrogen is removed and chains are joined into graphite planes.

Each carbon filament is produced from a polymer such as polyacrylonitrile (PAN), rayon, or petroleum pitch. All these polymers are known as precursors. For synthetic polymers such as PAN or rayon, the precursor is first spun into filament yarns, using chemical and mechanical processes to initially align the polymer molecules in a way to enhance the final physical properties of the completed carbon fiber. Precursor compositions and mechanical processes used during spinning filament yarns may vary among manufacturers. After drawing or spinning, the polymer filament yarns are then heated to drive off non-carbon atoms (carbonization), producing the final carbon fiber. The carbon-fiber-filament yarns may be further treated to improve handling qualities, then wound on to bobbins.

Carbon fiber preparation

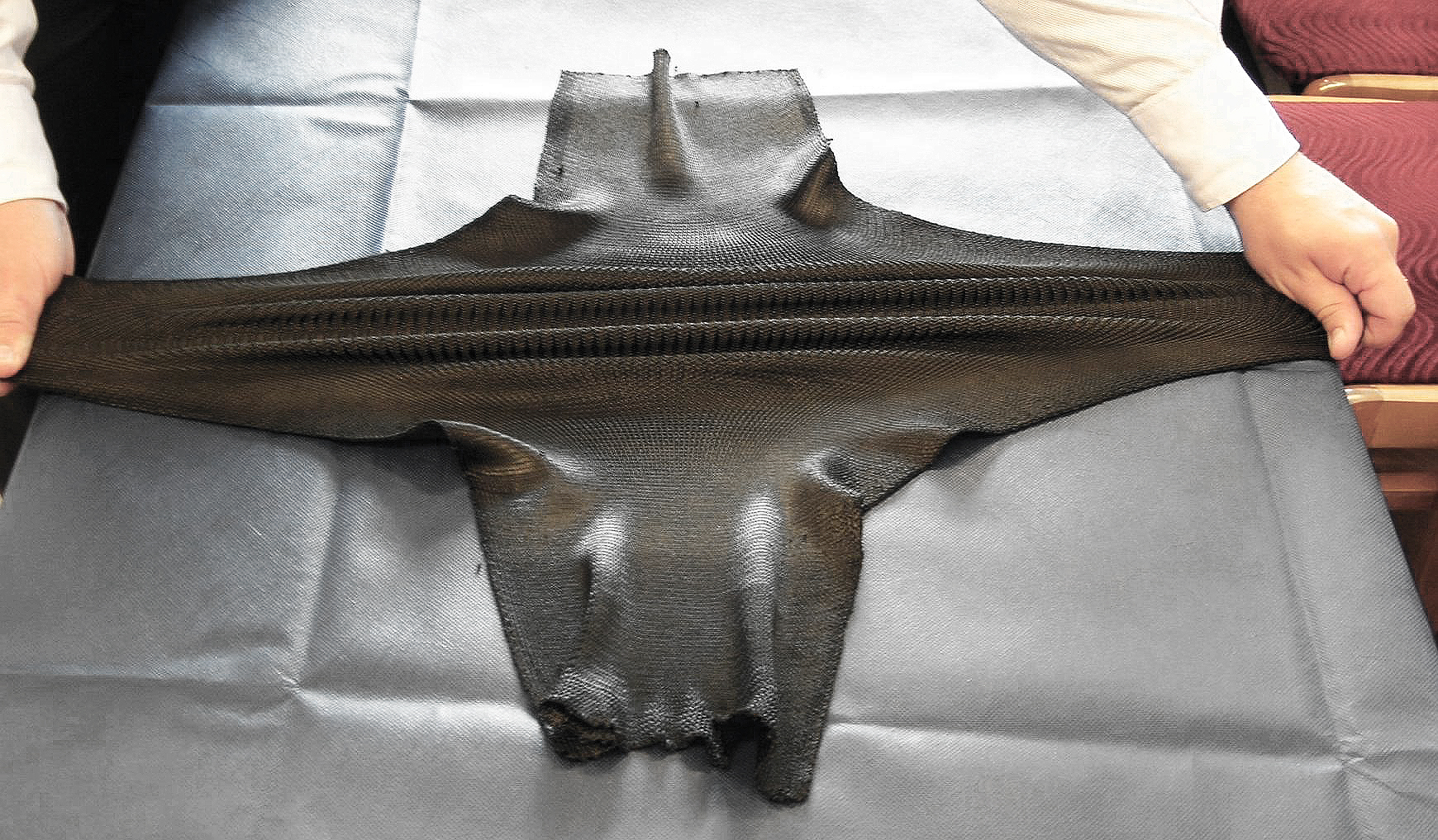
Flexibility of Carbon rayon based fabric

A common method of manufacture involves heating the spun PAN filaments to approximately 300 °C in air, which breaks many of the hydrogen bonds and oxidizes the material. During this process, fibers tend to shrink. The resulting chemical composition and mechanical properties of the fiber are dependent on the time and temperature of the process, as well as on the tension applied to the fiber during oxidation. The oxidized PAN is then placed into a furnace having an inert atmosphere of a gas such as argon, and heated to approximately 2000 °C, which induces graphitization of the material, changing the molecular bond structure. When heated in the correct conditions, these chains bond side-to-side (ladder polymers), forming narrow graphene sheets which eventually merge to form a single, columnar filament. The result is usually 93–95% carbon. Lower-quality fiber can be manufactured using pitch or rayon as the precursor instead of PAN. The carbon can become further enhanced, as high-modulus, or high-strength carbon, by heat treatment processes. Carbon heated in the range of 1500–2000 °C (carbonization) exhibits the highest tensile strength (5,650 MPa), while carbon fiber heated from 2500 to 3000 °C (graphitizing) exhibits a higher modulus of elasticity (531 GPa).

== See also ==
- Basalt fiber
- Carbon fiber reinforced polymer
- Carbon fiber reinforced ceramic material
- Carbon nanotube
- Electrostatic discharge materials
- Graphene
