= Integrity engineering =

Technical Integrity Engineering, also known as Asset Integrity, involves various engineering disciplines that focus on ensuring a product, process, or system meets its intended requirements when used. Applying these disciplines to reduce costs, maintain schedules, manage technical risks, and handle legal concerns during a project's entire life cycle ensures operational safety and efficiency in e.g., Oil and Gas, Power Generation, and Nuclear Power industries.

Integrity Engineering is a profession that uses science, math, economics, social insights, legal knowledge, and practical skills to ensure that products and systems are not only safe but also meet their legal and business requirements. Integrity Engineers perform tasks such as organizing inspections, managing integrity programs, and making sure plant facilities, including structures, pipelines, equipment, and piping systems, remain in good condition.

== Scope ==
Integrity Engineers may be required to manage, develop, or conduct the following:

- A high-level integrity management philosophy that includes verification and assurance of facilities (basic repair methods and strategies, Static equipment repair and temporary repairs, Fabric maintenance, Corrosion Engineering, Inspection Engineering, Chemical management, and Maintenance Management)
- A Competency Management scheme
- An RBI analysis
- Integrity processes, i.e., Write Risk-Based Inspection methodologies, Temporary Repair methodologies, Maintenance Strategies, Mechanical Integrity Management Strategy (MIMS), Structural Integrity Management Strategy (SIMS), Pipeline Integrity Management Strategy (PIMS), Well Integrity Management System (WIMS), and create corrosion circuits for the plant process
- Verification schemes and performance standards management
- Conduct life extension studies
- A Fitness-for-service review
- Write and review integrity Management Plans
- Identify, investigate and assess deterioration/corrosion and ensure timely maintenance of the affected facilities.
- Implement Inspection and Corrosion Control Policy and Risk Based Inspection (RBI) methods to manage integrity, and optimize inspections frequency, maintenance cost, and plant availability
- Lead and conduct RBI reviews
- Participate in the preparation of Capital and Operating budgets for Inspection
- Monitor and oversee the execution of inspection programs and activities
- Liaise closely with Operations, Technical Services, Corrosion engineering, Inspection Engineering, Verification Engineering, Process/Chemical and Mechanical Engineering and other Maintenance Units to coordinate major shutdowns and turn-around activities
- Supervise, witness, and participate in the certification process of hydro tests and load tests of lifting devices and cylinders
- Ensure systematic and consistent implementation of work methods and procedures used in Maintenance and Inspection and recommend improvements
- Ensure systematic update of maintenance management systems
- Participate in technical studies, Process and Instrument diagram reviews, Safety Integrity Level (SIL) assessments and HAZOPs
- Lead in failure investigations
- Input and control of asset integrity management software

Integrity Engineering encompasses the concept of:

- Organize, review, analyze, improve and control cycle
- Consistency of actions, values, methods, measures, principles, expectations, and outcomes
- An undivided or unbroken completeness or totality with nothing wanting
- Knowledge of many interfaces of technology
- Balancing and countering the materials degradation process during the in-service life cycle of equipment
- Ensuring the recommended risk mitigation actions derived from the RBI study are implemented
- Ensuring inspection intervals are not exceeded
- Ensuring resources are available for RBI Assessments

This may be applied to management, machines, devices, systems, materials, and processes that safely realize improvements to the lives of assets.

The Integrity Engineer (IE) may also be involved with other asset life-cycle issues, such as the basis of design (Process design basis) through to recycling. The Front End Engineering Design stage (FEED) aids in the selection of vessels, piping, pipelines, and other equipment. At this FEED stage, the optimum material requirements, mitigation, and maintenance requirements for the intended period of operation become the basis for detailed engineering. It is the role of the IE to develop/validate the integrity management plan and implement the monitoring and management procedure for the intended period of operation. It may also be the responsibility of the integrity engineer to incorporate and manage any variation identified (metal loss, material degradation, cracking mechanisms, mitigation issues, i.e. Cathodic protection potentials, coating failures, etc.) during the monitoring regime.

It may be a generalist in nature and/or applied with specific prior knowledge denoted using a pre-nominal of Mechanical, Inspection, Asset, Well or Wellhead, Technical, Pipeline, Signal, Fabrication, or Commissioning depending upon the equipment or system under scrutiny.

Integrity Engineers construct and implement Integrity Management plans that detail the requirements of the item or asset under scrutiny and study any adverse effects from internal or external sources that damage / impair that item or system. These are used to build suitable inspection and condition monitoring forward strategies. The monitoring may include physical (pipes/vessels) and nonphysical systems (Management legal obligations). This diversity will depend upon the requirements of the task at hand.

Integrity Engineers also oversee or carry out Integrity Engineering Audit(s) to ensure legal compliance with company, national and international standards and ensure quality assurance within the process that meets good engineering standards.

== See also ==
- Corrosion engineering
