= Aviation safety =

State in which risks associated with aviation are at an acceptable level

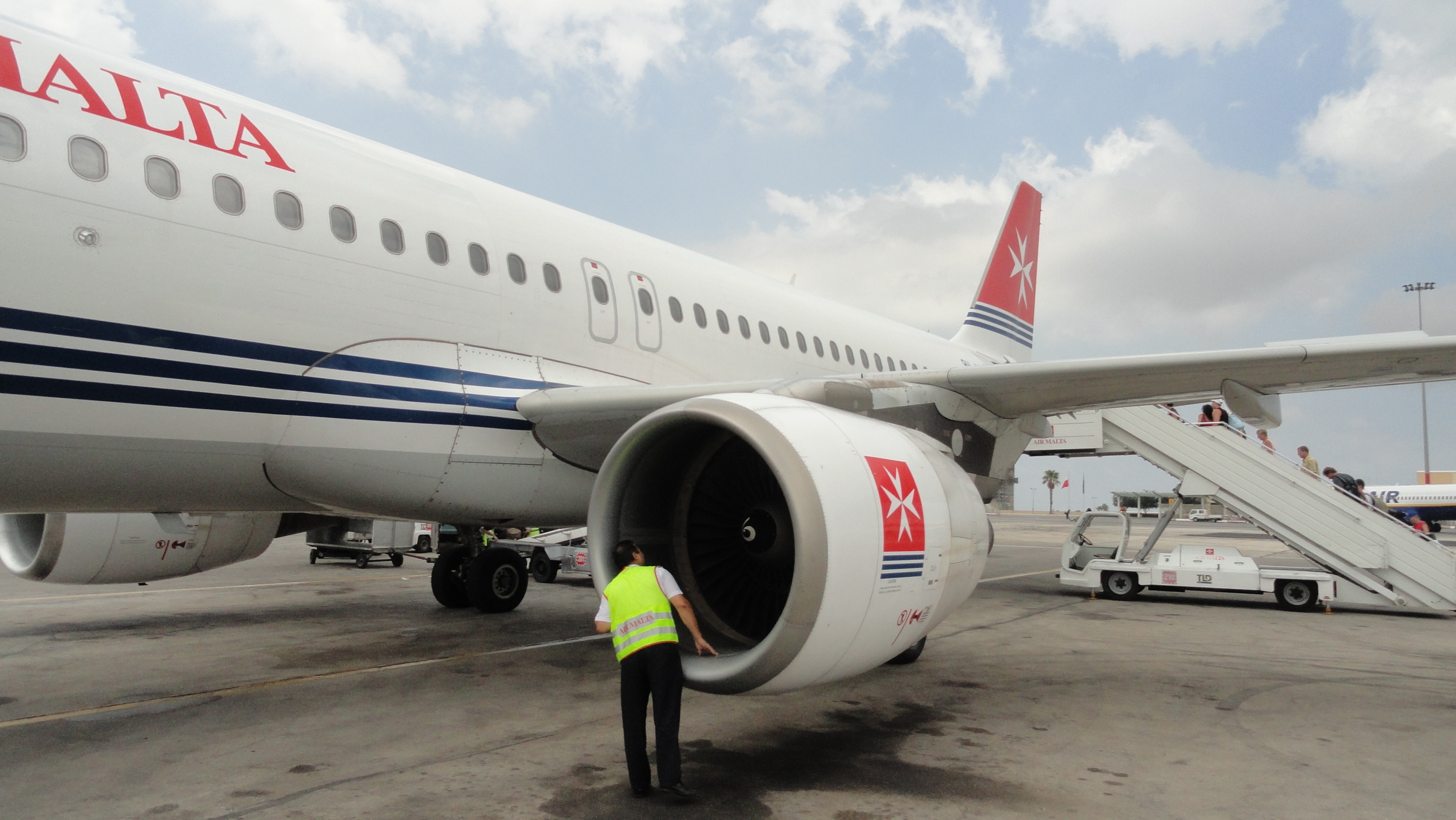
An Air Malta crewman performing a pre-flight inspection of an Airbus A320

Aviation safety is the study and practice of managing risks in aviation. This includes preventing aviation accidents and incidents through research, training aviation personnel, protecting passengers and the general public, and designing safer aircraft and aviation infrastructure. The aviation industry is subject to significant regulations and oversight to reduce risks across all aspects of flight. Adverse weather conditions such as turbulence, thunderstorms, icing, and reduced visibility are also recognized as major contributing factors to aviation safety.

Aviation security focuses on protecting air travelers, aircraft and infrastructure from intentional harm or disruption, rather than unintentional mishaps.

== Statistics ==
=== Evolution ===
Yearly fatalities (Note: from 14+ passengers airliners hull losses) since 1942, 5 year average in red: fatalities peaked in 1972.

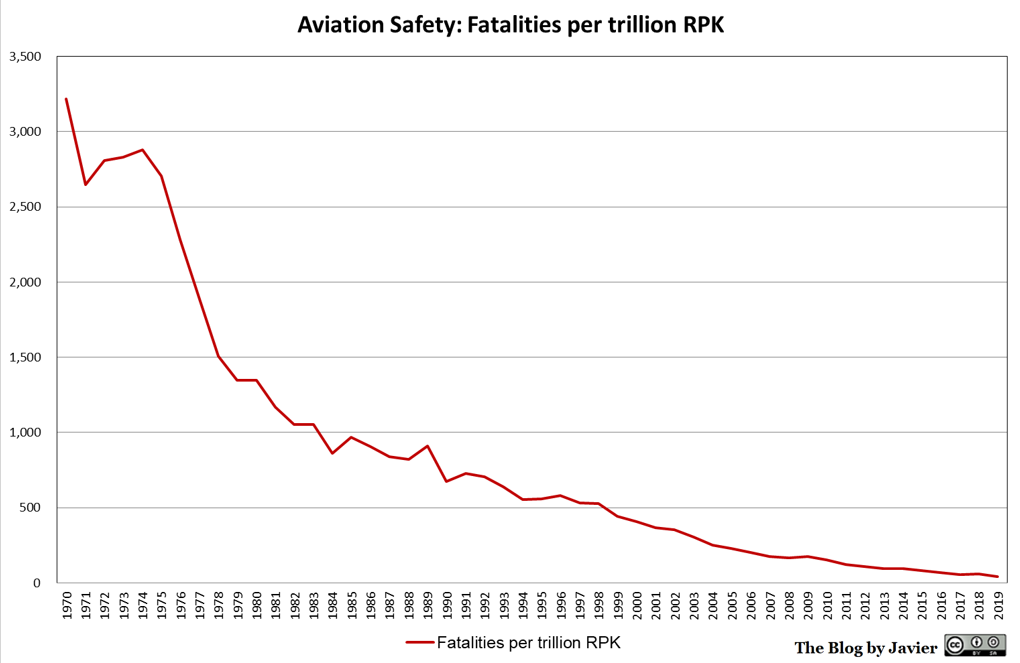
Fatalities per trillion revenue passenger kilometres since 1970 (five-year moving average for fatalities)

Aviation is safer today than ever. Modern commercial aviation boasts an accident rate of approximately 1 fatal accident per 16 million flights, far lower than historic numbers.

On December 14, 1903, the Wright Brothers conducted a test flight of their powered airplane from the slope of Big Kill Devil Hill in North Carolina. Upon takeoff, the airplane lifted about 15 feet off the ground, stalled, and crashed into the sand. Only three days later, on December 17, 1903, Wilbur's brother, Orville Wright flew the airplane for the world's first powered, sustained, and controlled heavier-than-air flight in history. Although the failed test flight on December 14 would be mostly forgotten in aviation, it remains one of the earliest recorded aviation accidents in history.

In the early years of air travel, accidents were exceedingly common. In 1928 and 1929, the overall accident rate was about 1 in every million miles (1.6 million kilometers) flown. In today's industry, that accident rate would translate to about 7,000 fatal accidents each year.

For the ten-year period 2002 to 2011, 0.6 fatal accidents happened per one million flights globally, 0.4 per million hours flown, and 22.0 fatalities per one million flights or 12.7 per million hours flown.

From 310 million passengers in 1970, air transport had grown to 3,696 million in 2016, led by 823 million in the United States, then 488 million in China. In 2016, 19 fatal accidents involved civil airliners with more than 14 passengers. These accidents resulted in 325 fatalities, the second safest year ever after 2015 with 16 accidents and 2013 with 265 fatalities. For planes heavier than 5.7 metric tones, there were 34.9 million departures and 75 accidents worldwide with 7 of these fatal for 182 fatalities, the lowest since 2013: 5.21 fatalities per million departures.

Stage of flight in which incidents occur, according to National Transportation Safety Board data from 2006 to 2023

View source data.

In 2017, there were 10 fatal airliner accidents, resulting in 44 occupant fatalities and 35 persons on the ground: the safest year ever for commercial aviation, both by the number of fatal accidents as well as in fatalities. By 2019, fatal accidents per million flights decreased 12-fold since 1970, from 6.35 to 0.51, and fatalities per trillion revenue passenger kilometre (RPK) decreased 81-fold from 3,218 to 40.

=== Typology ===
Runway safety represents 36% of accidents, ground safety 18% and loss of control in-flight 16%.

View source data.

Loss of control inflight represents 35% of the fatal accidents, Controlled flight into terrain 21%, runway excursions 17%, system or component failure: 6%, Touchdown off the runway: 5%, Abnormal Runway Contact: 4% and fire: 2%.

Safety has improved through better aircraft design process, engineering and maintenance, the evolution of navigation aids, and safety protocols and procedures.

=== Transport comparisons ===
There are three main ways in which the risk of fatality in a certain mode of travel can be measured: deaths per billion typical journeys taken, deaths per billion hours traveled, and deaths per billion kilometers traveled. The following table displays these statistics for the United Kingdom (1990–2000), and has been appended. (Note that aviation safety does not include travelling to the airport.)

| Transportation type | Deaths per billion | | |
| Transportation type | Journeys | Hours | Kilometers |
|---|---|---|---|
| Bus | 4 | 11 | 0.4 |
| Rail | 20 | 30 | 0.6 |
| Van | 20 | 60 | 1.2 |
| Private Car | 40 | 130 | 3.1 |
| Foot | 40 | 220 | 54.2 |
| Water | 90 | 50 | 2.6 |
| Air | 117 | 31 | 0.05 |
| Pedal cycle | 170 | 550 | 44.6 |
| Motorcycle | 1640 | 4840 | 108.9 |
| Paragliding (Note: The death per billion hours when skydiving assumes a 6-minute skydive (not accounting for the plane ascent). The death per billion journey when paragliding assumes an average flight of 15 minutes, so 4 flights per hour.) | | 8850 | |
| Skydiving | 7500 | 75000 | |
| Space Shuttle | 17000000 | 70000 | 6.6 |

The first two statistics are computed for typical travels by their respective forms of transport, so they cannot be used directly to compare risks related to different forms of transport in a particular travel "from A to B". For example, these statistics suggest that a typical flight from Los Angeles to New York would carry a larger risk factor than a typical car travel from home to office. However, car travel from Los Angeles to New York would not be typical; that journey would be as long as several dozen typical car travels, and thus the associated risk would be larger as well. Because the journey would take a much longer time, the overall risk associated with making this journey by car would be higher than making the same journey by air, even if each individual hour of car travel is less risky than each hour of flight.

For risks associated with long-range intercity travel, the most suitable statistic is the third one: deaths per billion kilometers. Still, this statistic can lose credence in situations where the availability of an air option makes an otherwise inconvenient journey possible.

Aviation industry insurers base their calculations on the deaths per journey statistic while the aviation industry itself generally uses the deaths per kilometre statistic in press releases.

Since 1997, the number of fatal air accidents has been no more than 1 per 2 billion person-miles flown, and thus is one of the safest modes of transportation when measured by distance traveled.

The Economist notes that air travel is safer by distance travelled, but trains are as safe as planes. It also notes that cars are four times more hazardous for deaths per time travelled, and cars and trains are respectively three times and six times safer than planes by number of journeys taken.

Because the above figures focus on everyday transportation, air travel is taken to include only standard civil passenger aviation offered commercially to the general public. Military and special-purpose aircraft are excluded.

=== United States ===
Between 1990 and 2015, there were 1874 commuter and air taxi accidents in the U.S. of which 454 (24%) were fatal, resulting in 1,296 deaths, including 674 accidents (36%) and 279 fatalities (22%) in Alaska alone.

The number of deaths per passenger-mile on commercial airlines in the United States between 2000 and 2010 was about 0.2 deaths per 10 billion passenger-miles. For driving, the rate was 150 per 10 billion vehicle-miles for 2000: 750 times higher per mile than for flying in a commercial airplane.

There were no fatalities on large scheduled commercial airlines in the United States for over nine years, between the Colgan Air Flight 3407 crash in February 2009 and a catastrophic engine failure on Southwest Airlines Flight 1380 in April 2018.

=== Security ===
Another aspect of safety is protection from intentional harm or property damage.

The terrorist attacks of 2001 are not counted as accidents. However, even if they were counted as accidents they would have added about 1 death per billion person-miles. Two months later, American Airlines Flight 587 crashed in New York City, killing 265 people, including 5 on the ground, causing 2001 to show a very high fatality rate. Even so, the rate that year including the attacks (estimated here to be about 4 deaths per billion person-miles), is safe compared to some other forms of transport when measured by distance traveled.

== Developments ==
=== Before WWII ===
The first aircraft electrical or electronic device avionics system was Lawrence Sperry's autopilot, demonstrated in June 1914. The Transcontinental Airway System chain of beacons was built by the Commerce Department in 1923 to guide airmail flights.

Gyrocopters were developed by Juan de la Cierva to avoid stall and spin accidents, and for that invented cyclic and collective controls used by helicopters. The first flight of a gyrocopter was on June 9th, 1923.

During the 1920s, the first laws were passed in the United States of America to regulate civil aviation, notably the Air Commerce Act of 1926, which required pilots and aircraft to be examined and licensed, for accidents to be properly investigated, and for the establishment of safety rules and navigation aids; under the Aeronautics Branch of the United States Department of Commerce (US DoC).

A network of aerial lighthouses was established in the United Kingdom and Europe during the 1920s and 1930s. Use of the lighthouses has declined with the advent of radio navigation aids such as non-directional beacon (NDB), VHF omnidirectional range (VOR), and distance measuring equipment (DME). The last operational aerial lighthouse in the United Kingdom is on top of the cupola over the RAF College main hall at RAF Cranwell.

One of the first aids for air navigation introduced in the United States in the late 1920s was airfield lighting, to assist pilots in making landings in poor weather or after dark. The Precision Approach Path Indicator (PAPI) was developed from this in the 1930s, indicating to the pilot the angle of descent to the airfield. This later became adopted internationally through the standards of the International Civil Aviation Organization (ICAO).

Jimmy Doolittle developed instrument rating and made his first 'blind' flight in September 1929. The March 1931 wooden wing failure of a Transcontinental & Western Air Fokker F-10 carrying Knute Rockne, coach of the University of Notre Dame's football team, showed cause for all-metal airframes and led to a more formal accident investigation system.

On 4 September 1933, a Douglas DC-1 test flight was conducted with one of the two engines shut down during the takeoff run, climbed to 8,000 feet (2,438 metres), and completed its flight, proving twin aircraft engine safety. With greater range than lights and weather immunity, radio navigation aids were first used in the 1930s, like the Australian Aeradio stations guiding transport flights, with a light beacon and a modified Lorenz beam transmitter (the German blind-landing equipment preceding the modern instrument landing system - ILS). ILS was first used by a scheduled flight to make a landing in a snowstorm at Pittsburgh, Pennsylvania, in 1938. A form of ILS was adopted by the ICAO for international use in 1949.

=== Post-WWII ===
Hard runways were built worldwide for World War II to avoid waves and floating hazards plaguing seaplanes.

Developed by the U.S. and introduced during World War II, LORAN replaced the sailors' less reliable compass and celestial navigation over water and survived until it was replaced by the Global Positioning System.

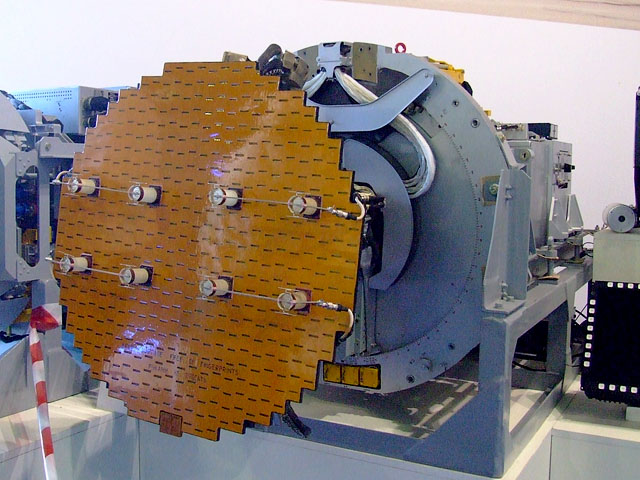
An airborne pulse-Doppler radar antenna. Some airborne radars can be used as meteorological radars.

Following the development of radar in World War II, it was deployed as a landing aid for civil aviation in the form of ground-controlled approach (GCA) systems then as the airport surveillance radar as an aid to air traffic control in the 1950s.

A number of ground-based weather radar systems can detect areas of precipitation such as thunderstorms, which are associated with severe turbulence.

A modern Honeywell Intuvue weather system visualizes weather patterns up to 300 miles (480 km) away.

Distance measuring equipment (DME) in 1948 and VHF omnidirectional range (VOR) stations became the main route navigation means during the 1960s, superseding the low frequency radio ranges and the non-directional beacon (NDB): the ground-based VOR stations were often co-located with DME transmitters and the pilots could establish their bearing and distance to the station.

=== Jetliners ===
To highlight the jetliner evolution, Airbus split them in four generations:

1. From 1952, early jets (Comet, Caravelle, BAC-111, Trident, B707, DC-8...) have dials and gauges cockpits and early auto-flight systems;
2. From 1964, new designs (A300, F28, BAe 146, B727, original B737 and B747, L-1011, DC-9, DC-10...) have more elaborate autopilot and autothrottle systems;
3. From 1980, glass cockpit & FMS designs (A310/A300-600, F100, B737 Classic & NG/MAX, B757/B767, B747-400/-8, Bombardier CRJ, Embraer ERJ, MD-11, MD-80/MD-90...) have improved navigation performance and Terrain Avoidance Systems, to reduce CFIT accidents;
4. From 1988, Fly-By-Wire (in the A220, A320 family, A330/A340, A350, A380, B777, B787 and Embraer E-Jets) enabled flight envelope protection to reduce LOC in flight accidents.

The fatal accident rate fell from 3.0 per million flights for the first generation to 0.9 for the next, 0.3 for the third and 0.1 for the last. However, certain aircraft have higher-than-average hull loss rates, such as the F28, MD-11, Concorde, and A310 due to various circumstances and/or design decisions. According to Boeing's Statistical Summary of Commercial Jet Airplane Accidents 1959–2024, the F28 has a hull loss rate of 4.62 per million flights. This is significantly higher than similar aircraft of its era, such as the 737-100/200 and DC-9, which have loss rates of 1.78 and 1.45 respectively. Similarly, the A310 and MD-11 have unusually high hull loss rates, with the A310 having the highest fatal hull loss rate and the MD-11 having the highest overall rate of all widebody commercial airliners. In the 1959–2003 edition, the Concorde is listed as having a hull loss rate of 11.36 per million flights as a result of its low number of flights. Consequently, its loss rate is higher than both the DC-8 and 707 (which have rates of 9.15 and 5.82 in that edition). Aircraft with high loss rates often have fundamental design flaws. The F28 has a known sensitivity to icing, which has led to numerous accidents including Air Ontario Flight 1363 and USAir Flight 405. Similarly, the MD-11 incorporated a relaxed stability design, which may have contributed to numerous landing accidents that have occurred, including Fedex Express Flight 80 and Lufthansa Cargo Flight 8460. The Concorde has a well-documented susceptibility to tire failures, experiencing up to 57 failures during its service, in which 32 of the blowouts resulted in damage to the structure, hydraulic systems or engines.

With the arrival of Wide Area Augmentation System (WAAS), satellite navigation has become accurate enough for altitude as well as positioning use, and is being used increasingly for instrument approaches as well as en-route navigation. However, because the GPS constellation is a single point of failure, on-board Inertial Navigation System (INS) or ground-based navigation aids are still required for backup.

In 2017, Rockwell Collins reported it had become more costly to certify than to develop a system, from 75% engineering and 25% certification in past years. It calls for global harmonization among certifying authorities to avoid redundant engineering and certification tests rather than recognizing others' approval and validation.

Groundings of entire classes of aircraft out of equipment safety concerns is unusual, but this has occurred to the de Havilland Comet in 1954 after multiple crashes due to metal fatigue and hull failure, the McDonnell Douglas DC-10 in 1979 after the crash of American Airlines Flight 191 due to engine loss, the Boeing 787 Dreamliner in 2013 after its battery problems, and the Boeing 737 MAX in 2019 after two crashes preliminarily tied to a flight control system.

== Hazards ==
=== Unapproved parts ===
Parts manufactured without an aviation authority's approval are described as "unapproved". Unapproved parts include inferior counterfeits, those used beyond their time limits, those that were previously approved but not properly returned to service, those with fraudulent labels, production overruns that were not sold with the agency's permission, and those that are untraceable. Unapproved faulty parts have caused hundreds of incidents and crashes, some fatal, including about 24 crashes between 2010 and 2016.

=== Foreign object debris ===
Foreign object debris (FOD) includes items left in the aircraft structure during manufacture/repairs, debris on the runway and solids encountered in flight (e.g. hail and dust). Such items can damage engines and other parts of the aircraft. In 2000, Air France Flight 4590 crashed after hitting a part that had fallen from a departing Continental Airlines DC-10.

=== Misleading information and lack of information ===
A pilot misinformed by a printed document (manual, map, etc.), reacting to a faulty instrument or indicator (in the cockpit or on the ground), or following inaccurate instructions or information from flight or ground control can lose situational awareness, or make errors, and accidents or near misses may result. The crash of Air New Zealand Flight 901 was a result of receiving and interpreting incorrect coordinates, which caused the pilots to inadvertently fly into a mountain.

=== Lightning ===
Boeing studies showed that airliners are struck by lightning twice per year on average; aircraft withstand typical lightning strikes without damage.

The dangers of more powerful positive lightning were not understood until the destruction of a glider in 1999. It has since been suggested that positive lightning might have caused the crash of Pan Am Flight 214 in 1963. At that time, aircraft were not designed to withstand such strikes because their existence was unknown. The 1985 standard in force in the US at the time of the glider crash, Advisory Circular AC 20-53A, was replaced by Advisory Circular AC 20-53B in 2006. However, it is unclear whether adequate protection against positive lightning was incorporated.

The effects of typical lightning on traditional metal-covered aircraft are well understood and serious damage from a lightning strike on an airplane is rare. Modern airliners like the Boeing 787 Dreamliner with exteriors and wings made from carbon-fiber-reinforced polymer have been tested and shown to receive no damage from lightning strikes during testing.

=== Ice and snow ===
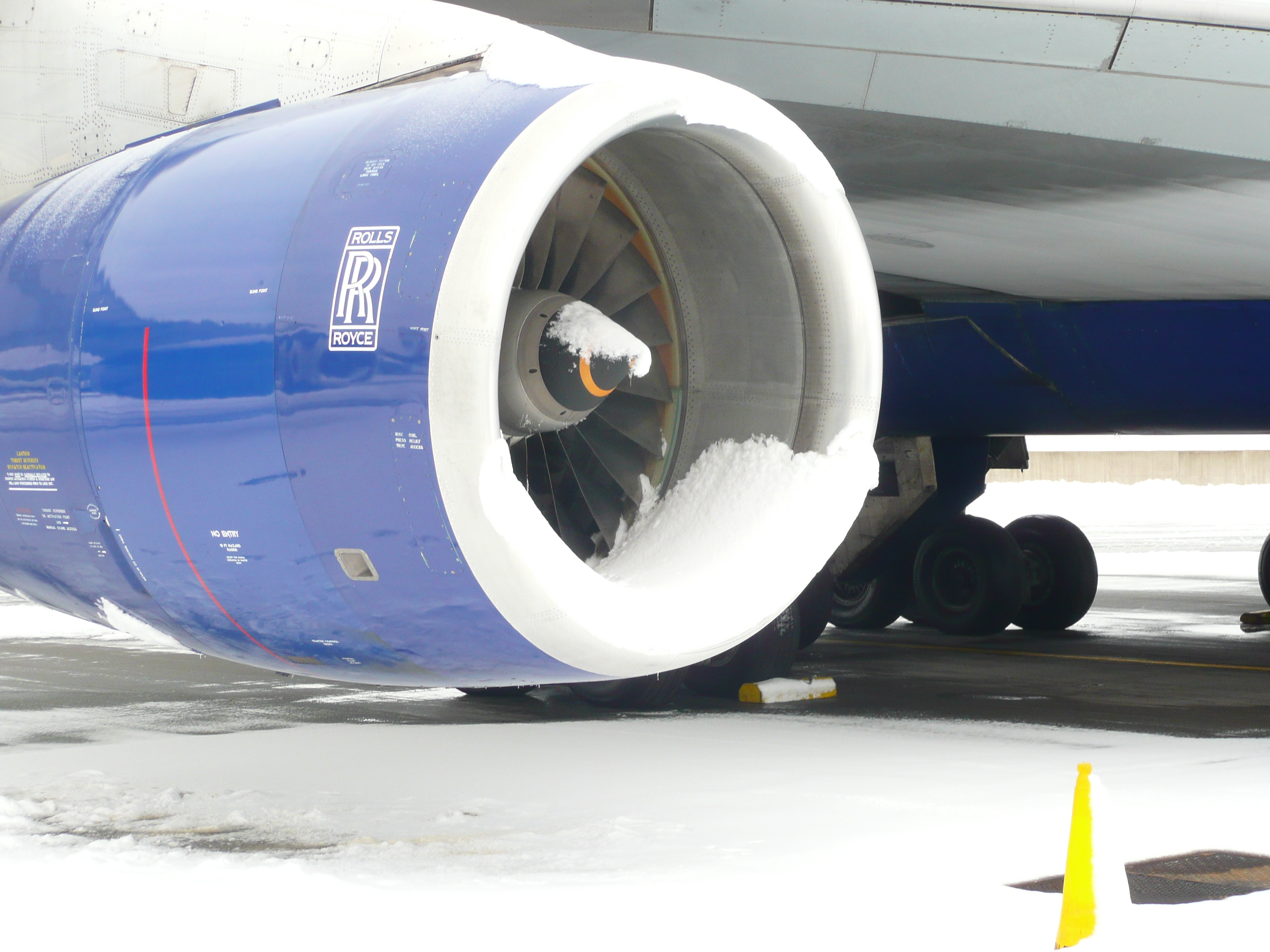
Snow building on the intake to a Rolls-Royce RB211 engine of a Boeing 747-400. Snow and ice present unique threats and aircraft operating in these weather conditions often require de-icing equipment.

Ice and snow can be major factors in airline accidents. In 2005, Southwest Airlines Flight 1248 slid off the end of a runway after landing in heavy snow conditions, killing one child on the ground.

Even a small amount of icing or coarse frost can greatly impair the ability of a wing to develop adequate lift, which is why regulations prohibit ice, snow or even frost on the wings or tail prior to takeoff. Air Florida Flight 90 crashed on takeoff in 1982, as a result of ice/snow on its wings.

An accumulation of ice during flight can be catastrophic, as evidenced by the loss of control and subsequent crashes of American Eagle Flight 4184 in 1994, and Comair Flight 3272 in 1997. Both aircraft were turboprop airliners, with straight wings, which tend to be more susceptible to inflight ice accumulation, than are swept-wing jet airliners.

Airlines and airports ensure that aircraft are properly de-iced before takeoff whenever the weather involves icing conditions. Modern airliners are designed to prevent ice buildup on wings, engines, and tails (empennage) by either routing heated air from jet engines through the leading edges of the wing, and inlets, or on slower aircraft, by use of inflatable rubber "boots" that expand to break off any accumulated ice.

Airline flight plans require airline dispatch offices to monitor the progress of weather along the routes of their flights, helping the pilots to avoid the worst of inflight icing conditions. Aircraft can also be equipped with an ice detector in order to warn pilots to leave unexpected ice accumulation areas, before the situation becomes critical. Pitot tubes in modern airplanes and helicopters have been provided with the function of "Pitot Heating" to prevent accidents like Air France Flight 447 caused by the pitot tube freezing and giving false readings.

=== Wind shear or microburst ===
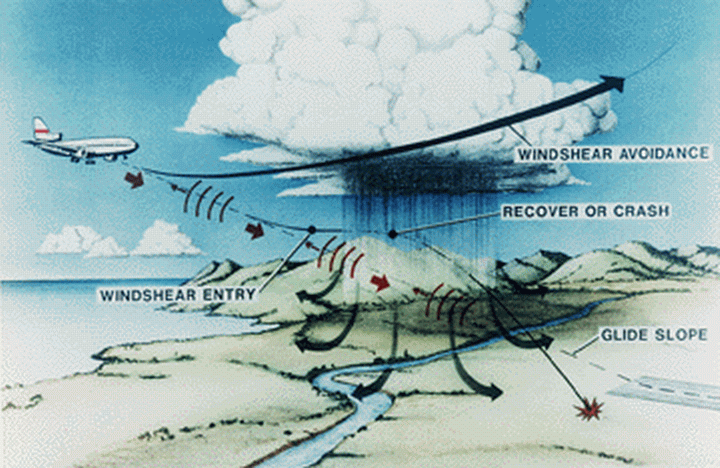
Effect of wind shear on aircraft trajectory. Note how merely correcting for the initial gust front can have dire consequences.

A wind shear is a change in wind speed and/or direction over a relatively short distance in the atmosphere. A microburst is a localized column of sinking air that drops down in a thunderstorm. Both of these are potential weather threats that may cause an aviation accident.

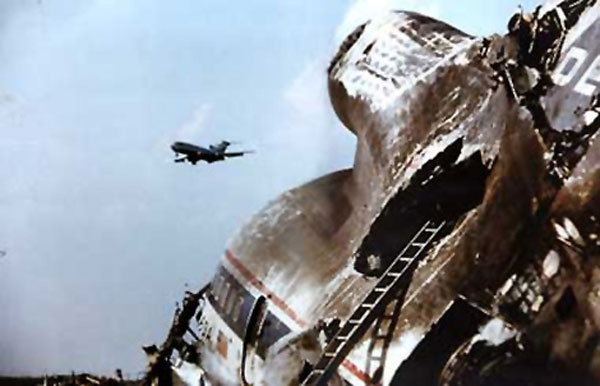
Wreckage of Delta Air Lines Flight 191 tail section after a microburst slammed the aircraft into the ground

Strong outflow from thunderstorms causes rapid changes in the three-dimensional wind velocity just above ground level. Initially, this outflow causes a headwind that increases airspeed, which normally causes a pilot to reduce engine power if they are unaware of the wind shear. As the aircraft passes into the region of the downdraft, the localized headwind diminishes, reducing the aircraft's airspeed and increasing its sink rate. Then, when the aircraft passes through the other side of the downdraft, the headwind becomes a tailwind, reducing lift generated by the wings, and leaving the aircraft in a low-power, low-speed descent. This can lead to an accident if the aircraft is too low to effect a recovery before ground contact. Between 1964 and 1985, wind shear directly caused or contributed to 26 major civil transport aircraft accidents in the U.S. that led to 620 deaths and 200 injuries.

=== Engine failure ===
An engine may fail to function because of fuel starvation (e.g. British Airways Flight 38), fuel exhaustion (e.g. Air Canada Flight 143), foreign object damage (e.g. US Airways Flight 1549), mechanical failure due to metal fatigue (e.g. Kegworth air disaster, El Al Flight 1862, China Airlines Flight 358), mechanical failure due to improper maintenance (e.g. American Airlines Flight 191), mechanical failure caused by an original manufacturing defect in the engine (e.g. Qantas Flight 32, United Airlines Flight 232, Delta Air Lines Flight 1288), and pilot error (e.g. Pinnacle Airlines Flight 3701).

In a multi-engine aircraft, failure of a single engine usually results in a precautionary landing being performed, for example, landing at a diversion airport instead of continuing to the intended destination. Failure of a second engine (e.g. US Airways Flight 1549) or damage to other aircraft systems caused by an uncontained engine failure (e.g. United Airlines Flight 232) may, if an emergency landing is not possible, result in the aircraft crashing.

=== Structural failure of the aircraft ===
Examples of failure of aircraft structures caused by metal fatigue include the de Havilland Comet accidents (1950s) and Aloha Airlines Flight 243 (1988). Improper repair procedures can also cause structural failures, including Japan Air Lines Flight 123 (1985) and China Airlines Flight 611 (2002). Now that the subject is better understood, rigorous inspection and nondestructive testing procedures are in place.

Composite materials consist of layers of fibers embedded in a resin matrix. In some cases, especially when subjected to cyclic stress, the layers of the material separate from each other (delaminate) and lose strength. As the failure develops inside the material, nothing is shown on the surface; instrument methods (often ultrasound-based) have to be used to detect such a material failure. In the 1940s several Yakovlev Yak-9s experienced delamination of plywood in their construction.

=== Design flaws ===
An error in the aircraft's design can cause accidents, even if it was not the accident's primary cause. Examples include Lion Air Flight 610 (2018) and Ethiopian Airlines Flight 302 (2019), which both suffered a loss of control in flight leading to both planes crashing. The cause was discovered to be a design flaw in the Maneuvering Characteristics Augmentation System (MCAS) software that was designed to improve the handling of the Boeing 737 MAX aircraft. But instead caused both aircraft to pitch nose down uncontrollably in flight due to a faulty angle of attack sensor, as the design allowed for only one sensor's readings to be used.

Another example is Airlines PNG Flight 1600 (2011) which suffered a fatal forced landing, primarily due to an engine failure. This failure was discovered to be caused by a design flaw in the power levers, which allowed the pilot to accidentally place the levers into reverse due to the design of the levers.

=== Stalling ===
Stalling an aircraft (increasing the angle of attack to a point at which the wings fail to produce enough lift) is dangerous and can result in a crash if the pilot fails to make a timely correction.

Devices to warn the pilot when the aircraft's speed is decreasing close to the stall speed include stall warning horns (now standard on virtually all powered aircraft), stick shakers, and voice warnings. Most stalls are a result of the pilot allowing the airspeed to be too slow for the particular weight and configuration at the time. Stall speed is higher when ice or frost has attached to the wings and/or tail stabilizer. The more severe the icing, the higher the stall speed, not only because smooth airflow over the wings becomes increasingly more difficult, but also because of the added weight of the accumulated ice.

Crashes caused by a full stall of the airfoils include:

- British European Airways Flight 548 (1972)
- United Airlines Flight 553 (1972)
- Aeroflot Flight 7425 (1985)
- Arrow Air Flight 1285 (1985)
- Northwest Airlines Flight 255 (1987)
- The Paul Wellstone crash (2002)
- Colgan Air Flight 3407 (2009)
- Turkish Airlines Flight 1951 crash (2009)
- Air France Flight 447 (2009)

=== Fire ===
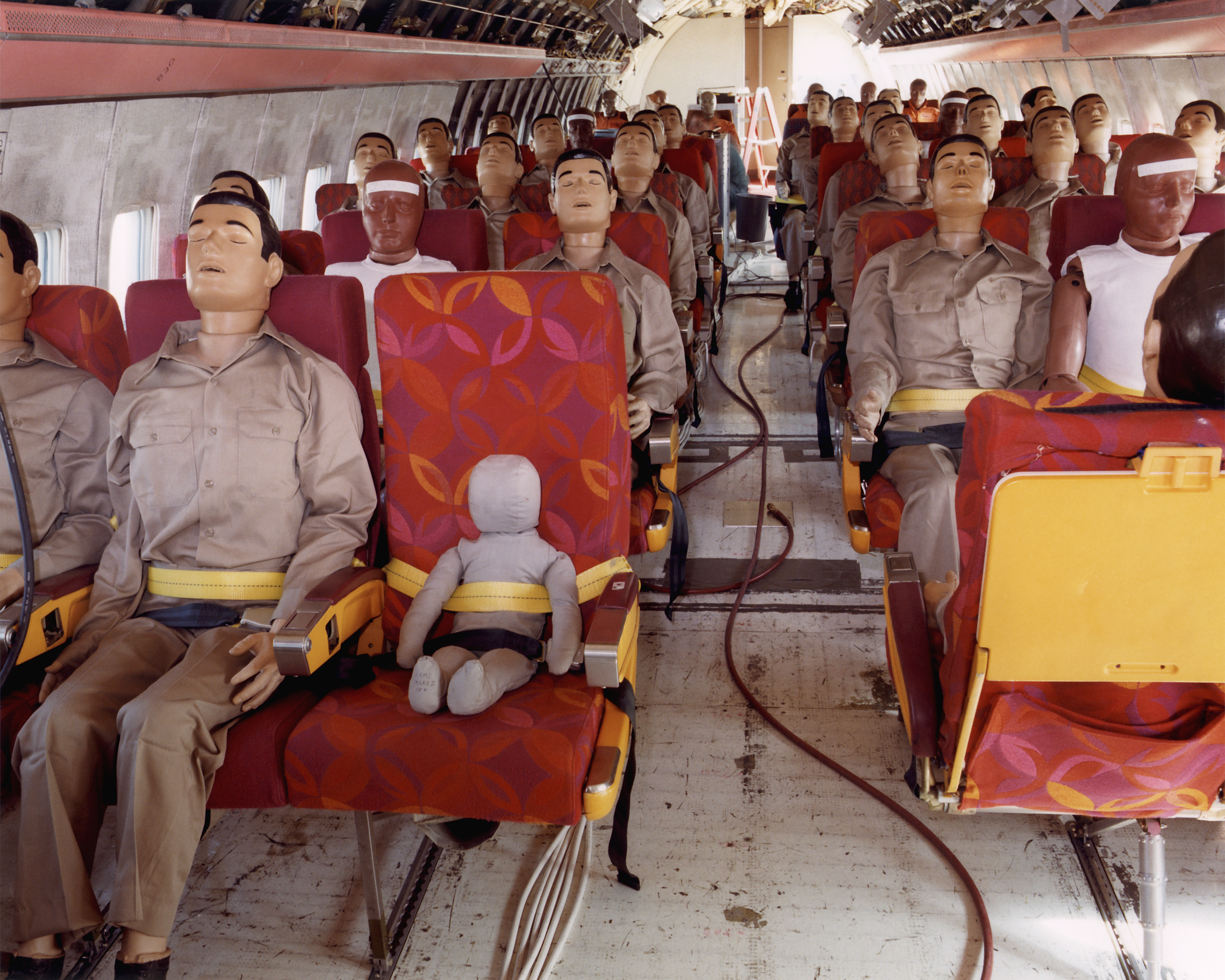
NASA air safety experiment (CID project)

Safety regulations control aircraft materials and the requirements for automated fire safety systems. Usually these requirements take the form of required tests. The tests measure flammability of materials and toxicity of smoke. When the tests fail, it is on a prototype in an engineering laboratory rather than in an aircraft.

Fire and its toxic smoke have been the cause of accidents. An electrical fire on Air Canada Flight 797 in 1983 caused the deaths of 23 of the 46 passengers, resulting in the introduction of floor-level lighting to assist people to evacuate a smoke-filled aircraft. In 1985, a fire on the runway caused the loss of 55 lives, 48 from the effects of incapacitating and subsequently lethal toxic gas and smoke in the British Airtours Flight 28M accident which raised serious concerns relating to survivability – something that had not been studied in such detail. The swift incursion of the fire into the fuselage and the layout of the aircraft impaired passengers' ability to evacuate, with areas such as the forward galley area becoming a bottleneck for escaping passengers, with some dying very close to the exits. Much research into evacuation and cabin and seating layouts was carried out at Cranfield Institute to try to measure what makes a good evacuation route, which led to the seat layout by Overwing exits being changed by mandate and the examination of evacuation requirements relating to the design of galley areas. The use of smoke hoods or misting systems were also examined although both were rejected.

South African Airways Flight 295 was lost in the Indian Ocean in 1987 after an in-flight fire in the cargo hold could not be suppressed by the crew. The cargo holds of most airliners are now equipped with automated halon fire extinguishing systems to combat a fire that might occur in the baggage holds. In May 1996, ValuJet Flight 592 crashed into the Florida Everglades a few minutes after takeoff because of a fire in the forward cargo hold. All 110 people on board were killed.

At one time, firefighting foam paths were laid down before an emergency landing, but the practice was considered only marginally effective, and concerns about the depletion of firefighting capability due to pre-foaming led the United States FAA to withdraw its recommendation in 1987.

One possible cause of fires in airplanes is wiring problems that involve intermittent faults, such as wires with breached insulation touching each other, having water dripping on them, or short circuits. Notable was Swissair Flight 111 in 1998 due to an arc in the wiring of IFE which ignited flammable MPET insulation. These are difficult to detect once the aircraft is on the ground. However, there are methods, such as spread-spectrum time-domain reflectometry, that can feasibly test live wires on aircraft during flight.

=== Bird strike ===
Bird strike is an aviation term for a collision between a bird and an aircraft. Fatal accidents have been caused by both engine failure following bird ingestion and bird strikes breaking cockpit windshields.

Jet engines have to be designed to withstand the ingestion of birds of a specified weight and number and to not lose more than a specified amount of thrust. The weight and numbers of birds that can be ingested without endangering the safe flight of the aircraft are related to the engine intake area. The hazards of ingesting birds beyond the "designed-for" limit were shown on US Airways Flight 1549 when the aircraft struck Canada geese.

The outcome of an ingestion event and whether it causes an accident, be it on a small fast plane, such as military jet fighters, or a large transport, depends on the number and weight of birds and where they strike the fan blade span or the nose cone. Core damage usually results from impacts near the blade root or on the nose cone.

The highest risk of a bird strike occurs during takeoff and landing in the vicinity of airports, and during low-level flying, for example by military aircraft, crop dusters and helicopters. Some airports use active countermeasures, including a person with a shotgun, playing recorded sounds of predators through loudspeakers, or employing falconers. Poisonous grass can be planted that is not palatable to birds, nor to insects that attract insectivorous birds. Passive countermeasures involve sensible land-use management, avoiding conditions attracting flocks of birds to the area (e.g. landfills). Another tactic found effective is to let the grass at the airfield grow taller (to approximately 12 inches or 30 centimetres) as some species of birds won't land if they cannot see one another.

=== Human factors ===
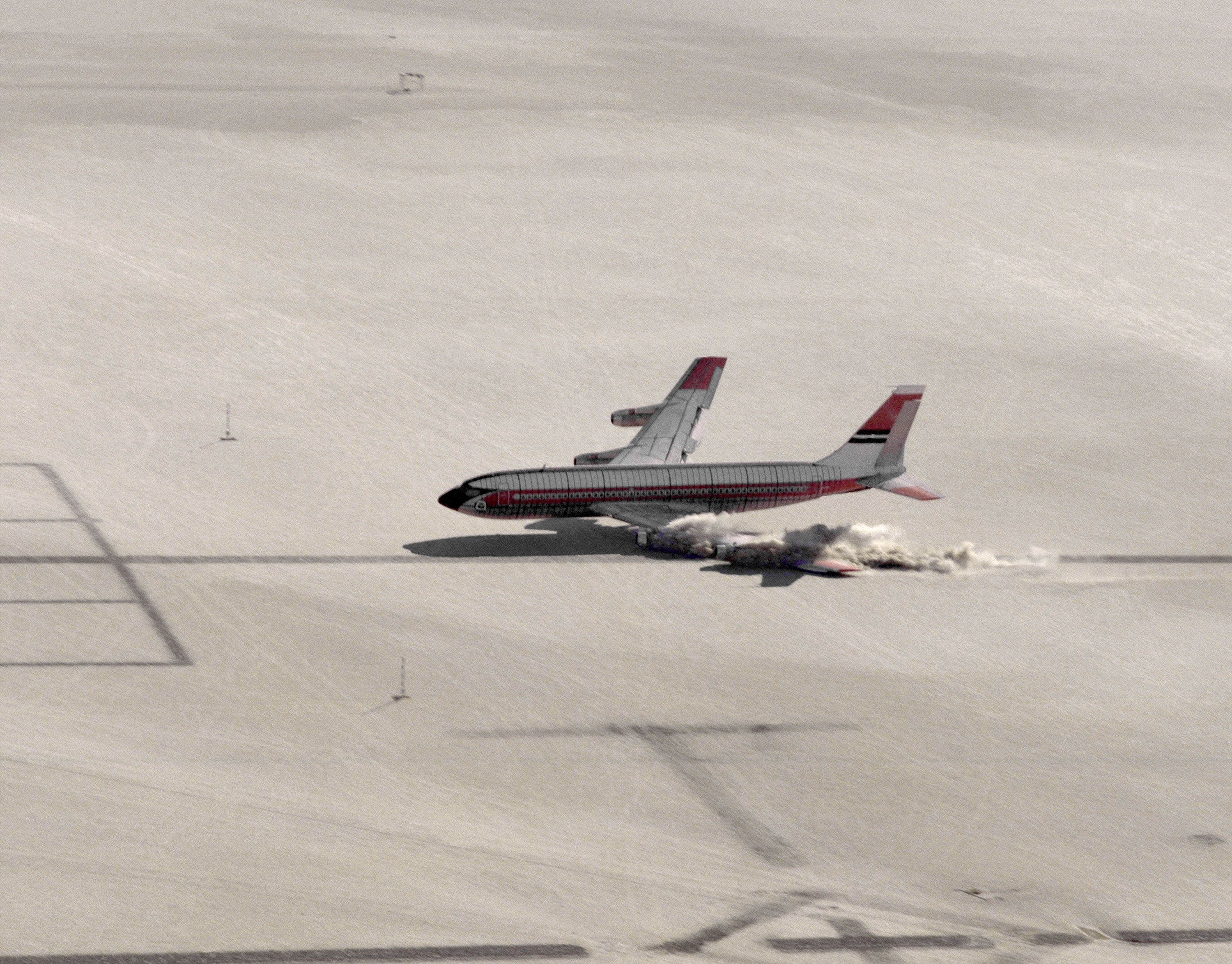
NASA air safety experiment (CID project). The airplane is a Boeing 720 testing a form of jet fuel, known as "antimisting kerosene", which formed a difficult-to-ignite gel when agitated violently, as in a crash.

Human factors, including pilot error, are another potential set of factors, and currently the factor most commonly found in aviation accidents. Much progress in applying human factors analysis to improving aviation safety was made around the time of World War II by such pioneers as Paul Fitts and Alphonse Chapanis. However, there has been progress in safety throughout the history of aviation, such as the development of the pilot's checklist in 1937. CRM, or crew resource management, is a technique that makes use of the experience and knowledge of the complete flight crew to avoid dependence on just one crew member, and to improve pilot decision making.

Pilot error and improper communication are often factors in the collision of aircraft. This can take place in the air (1978 Pacific Southwest Airlines Flight 182) (TCAS) or on the ground (1977 Tenerife disaster) (RAAS). The barriers to effective communication have internal and external factors. The ability of the flight crew to maintain situational awareness is a critical human factor in air safety. Human factors training is available to general aviation pilots and called single pilot resource management training.

Failure of the pilots to properly monitor the flight instruments caused the crash of Eastern Air Lines Flight 401 in 1972. Controlled flight into terrain (CFIT) and errors during take-off and landing can have catastrophic consequences, for example causing the crash of Prinair Flight 191 on landing, also in 1972.

==== Pilot fatigue ====
The International Civil Aviation Organization (ICAO) defines fatigue as "A physiological state of reduced mental or physical performance capability resulting from sleep loss or extended wakefulness, circadian phase, or workload." The phenomenon places great risk on the crew and passengers of an airplane because it significantly increases the chance of pilot error. Fatigue is particularly prevalent among pilots because of "unpredictable work hours, long duty periods, circadian disruption, and insufficient sleep". These factors can occur together to produce a combination of sleep deprivation, circadian rhythm effects, and 'time-on task' fatigue. Regulators attempt to mitigate fatigue by limiting the number of hours pilots are allowed to fly over varying periods of time. Experts in aviation fatigue often find that these methods fall short of their goals.

==== Piloting while intoxicated ====
Rarely, flight crew members are arrested or subject to disciplinary action for being intoxicated on the job. In 1990, three Northwest Airlines crew members were sentenced to jail for flying while drunk. In 2001, Northwest fired a pilot who failed a breathalyzer test after a flight. In July 2002, both pilots of America West Airlines Flight 556 were arrested just before they were scheduled to fly because they had been drinking alcohol. The pilots were fired and the FAA revoked their pilot licenses. At least one fatal airliner accident involving drunk pilots occurred when Aero Flight 311 crashed at Kvevlax, Finland, killing all 25 on board in 1961. Another example is the crash of Aeroflot Flight 821, in which the captain's intoxication contributed to the accident, killing all 88 on board.

==== Pilot suicide and murder ====
There have been rare instances of suicide by pilots. Although most air crew are screened for psychological fitness, a very few authorized pilots have committed acts of suicide and even mass murder.

In 1982, Japan Airlines Flight 350 crashed while on approach to the Tokyo Haneda Airport, killing 24 of the 174 on board. The official investigation found the mentally ill captain had attempted suicide by placing the inboard engines into reverse thrust, while the aircraft was close to the runway. The first officer did not have enough time to countermand before the aircraft stalled and crashed.

In 1997, SilkAir Flight 185 suddenly went into a high dive from its cruising altitude. The speed of the dive was so high that the aircraft began to break apart before it finally crashed near Palembang, Sumatra. After three years of investigation, the Indonesian authorities declared that the cause of the accident could not be determined. However, the US NTSB concluded that deliberate suicide by the captain was the only reasonable explanation.

In 1999 in the case of EgyptAir Flight 990, it appears that the first officer deliberately crashed into the Atlantic Ocean while the captain was away from his station.

Crew involvement is one of the speculative theories in the disappearance of Malaysia Airlines Flight 370 on 8 March 2014.

On 24 March 2015, Germanwings Flight 9525 (an Airbus A320-200) crashed 100 kilometres (62 miles) north-west of Nice, in the French Alps, after a constant descent that began one minute after the last routine contact with air traffic control, and shortly after the aircraft had reached its assigned cruise altitude. All 144 passengers and six crew members were killed. The crash was intentionally caused by the co-pilot, Andreas Lubitz. Having been declared 'unfit to work' without telling his employer, Lubitz reported for duty, and during the flight locked the captain out of the flight deck. In response to the incident and the circumstances of Lubitz's involvement, aviation authorities in Canada, New Zealand, Germany, and Australia implemented new regulations that require two authorised personnel to be present in the cockpit at all times. Three days after the incident, the European Aviation Safety Agency (EASA) issued a temporary recommendation for airlines to ensure that at least two crew members, including at least one pilot, are in the cockpit at all times of the flight. Several airlines announced they had already adopted similar policies voluntarily.

==== Deliberate aircrew inaction ====
Inaction, omission, failure to act as required, willful disregard of safety procedures, disdain for rules, and unjustifiable risk-taking by pilots have also led to accidents and incidents.

Although Smartwings QS-1125 flight of 22 August 2019 successfully made an emergency landing at destination, the captain was censured for failing to follow mandatory procedures, including for not landing at the nearest possible diversion airport after an engine failure.

==== Human factors of third parties ====
Unsafe human factors are not limited to pilot errors. Third-party factors include ground crew mishaps, ground vehicle-to-aircraft collisions and engineering maintenance-related problems. For example, failure to properly close a cargo door on Turkish Airlines Flight 981 in 1974 caused the loss of the aircraft. (However, the design of the cargo door latch was also a major factor in the accident.) In the case of Japan Air Lines Flight 123 in 1985, improper repair of previous damage led to explosive decompression of the cabin, which in turn destroyed the vertical stabilizer and damaged all four hydraulic systems that powered all the flight controls.

==== Controlled flight into terrain ====
Controlled flight into terrain (CFIT) is a class of accidents in which an aircraft is flown under control into terrain or man-made structures. CFIT accidents typically result from pilot error or navigational system error. Failure to protect ILS critical areas can also cause CFIT accidents. In December 1995, American Airlines Flight 965 tracked off course while approaching Cali, Colombia, and hit a mountainside despite a terrain awareness and warning system (TAWS) terrain warning in the cockpit and a desperate pilot attempt to gain altitude after the warning. Crew position awareness and monitoring of navigational systems are essential to the prevention of CFIT accidents. As of February 2008, over 40,000 aircraft had enhanced TAWS installed, and they had flown over 800 million hours without a CFIT accident.

Another anti-CFIT tool is the Minimum Safe Altitude Warning (MSAW) system which monitors the altitudes transmitted by aircraft transponders and compares that with the system's defined minimum safe altitudes for a given area. When the system determines the aircraft is lower, or might soon be lower, than the minimum safe altitude, the air traffic controller receives an acoustic and visual warning and then alerts the pilot that the aircraft is too low.

==== Electromagnetic interference ====
The use of certain electronic equipment is partially or entirely prohibited as it might interfere with aircraft operation, such as causing compass deviations. Use of some types of personal electronic devices is prohibited when an aircraft is below 10,000 feet (3,000 m), taking off, or landing. Use of a mobile phone is prohibited on most flights because in-flight usage creates problems with ground-based cells. Wireless devices such as cellphones feature an airplane mode.

=== Ground damage ===
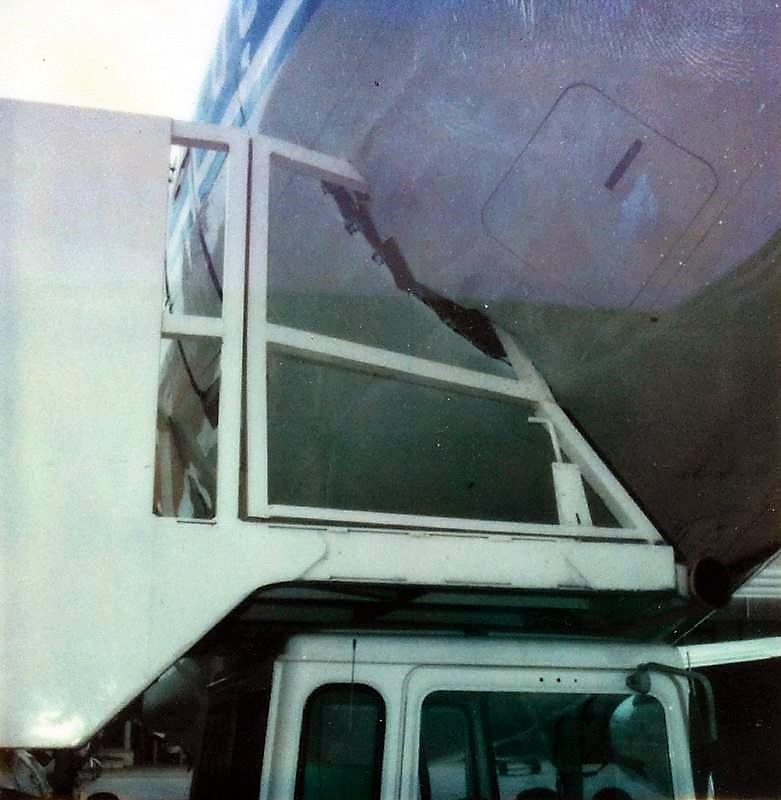
Ground damage to an aircraft. Several stringers were cut and the aircraft was grounded.

Various ground support equipment operate in proximity to the fuselage and wings to service the aircraft and occasionally cause accidental damage in the form of scratches in the paint or small dents in the skin. However, because aircraft structures (including the outer skin) play such a critical role in the safe operation of a flight, all damage is inspected, measured, and possibly tested to ensure that any damage is within safe tolerances.

An example problem was the depressurization incident on Alaska Airlines Flight 536 in 2005. During ground services, a baggage handler hit the side of the aircraft with a tug towing a train of baggage carts. This damaged the metal skin of the aircraft. This damage was not reported and the plane departed. Climbing through 26,000 feet (7,900 m) the damaged section of the skin gave way under the difference in pressure between the inside of the aircraft and the outside air. The cabin depressurized explosively necessitating a rapid descent to denser (breathable) air and an emergency landing. Post-landing examination of the fuselage revealed a 12-inch (30 cm) hole on the right side of the airplane.

=== Volcanic ash ===
Plumes of volcanic ash near active volcanoes can damage propellers, engines and cockpit windows. In 1982, British Airways Flight 9 flew through an ash cloud and temporarily lost power from all four engines. The plane was badly damaged, with all the leading edges being scratched. The front windscreens had been so badly "sand" blasted by the ash that they could not be used to land the aircraft.

Prior to 2010 the general approach taken by airspace regulators was that if the ash concentration rose above zero, then the airspace was considered unsafe and was consequently closed. Volcanic Ash Advisory Centers enable liaison between meteorologists, volcanologists, and the aviation industry.

=== Runway safety ===
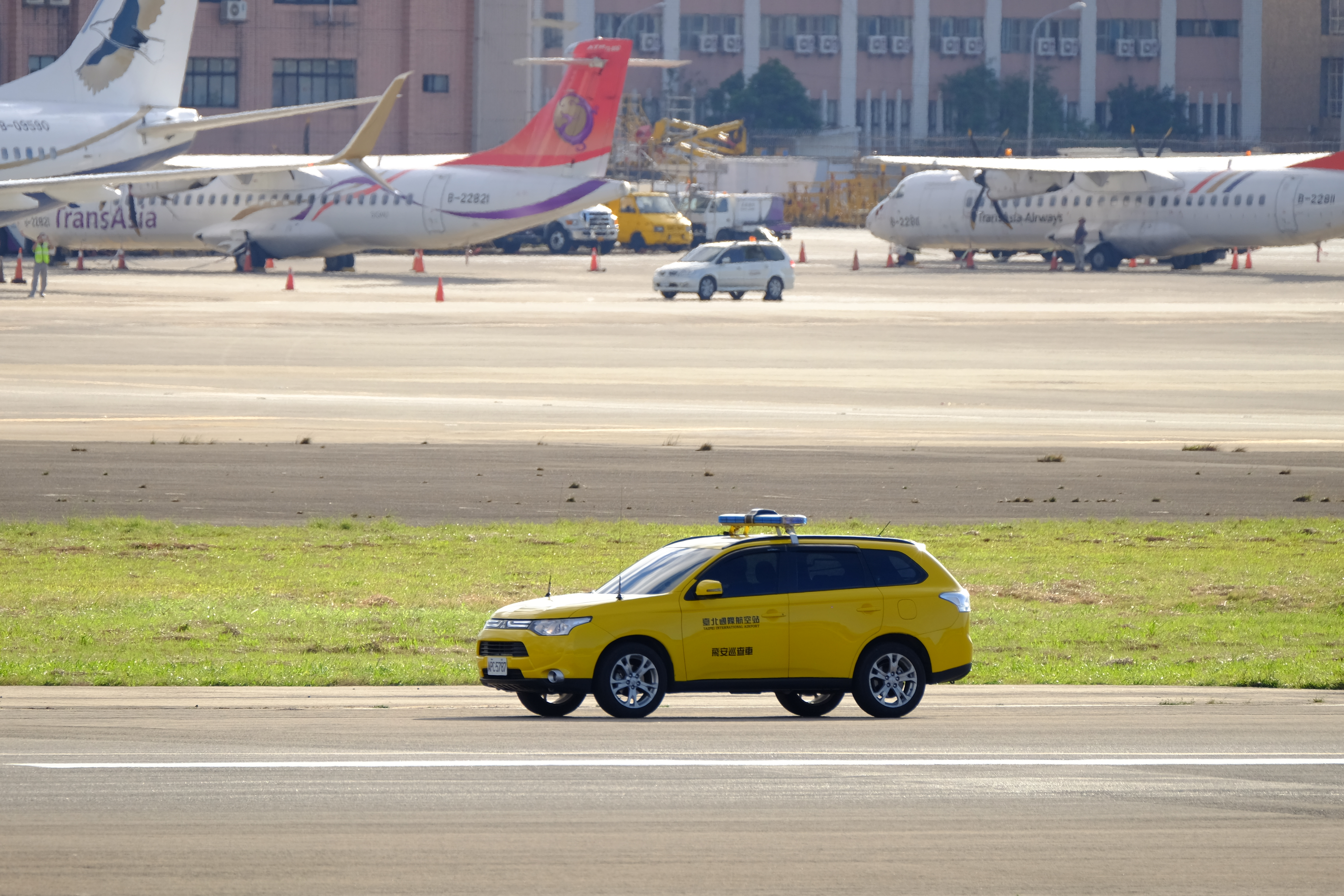
Airport safety car at an Airport in Taiwan

Types of runway safety incidents include:

- Runway excursion – an incident involving only a single aircraft making an inappropriate exit from the runway.
- Runway overrun – a specific type of excursion where the aircraft does not stop before the end of the runway (e.g., Air France Flight 358).
- Runway incursion – incorrect presence of a vehicle, person, or another aircraft on the runway (e.g., Tenerife airport disaster).
- Runway confusion – crew misidentification of the runway for landing or take-off (e.g., Comair Flight 5191, Singapore Airlines Flight 6).

The last two types can be prevented with airport surveillance and broadcast systems, a Runway Awareness and Advisory System, and landing navigation systems (e.g. transponder landing system, microwave landing system, instrument landing system).

=== Terrorism ===
Aircrew are normally trained to handle hijack situations. Since the September 11, 2001 attacks, stricter airport and airline security measures are in place to prevent terrorism, such as security checkpoints and locking the cockpit doors during flight.

In the United States, the Federal Flight Deck Officer program is run by the Federal Air Marshal Service, with the aim of training active and licensed airline pilots to carry weapons and defend their aircraft against criminal activity and terrorism. Upon completion of government training, selected pilots enter a covert law enforcement and counter-terrorism service. Their jurisdiction is normally limited to a flight deck or a cabin of a commercial airliner or a cargo aircraft they operate while on duty.

=== Military action ===
Passenger planes have rarely been attacked in both peacetime and war. Examples:

- In 1955, Bulgaria shot down El Al Flight 402.
- In 1973, Israel shot down Libyan Arab Airlines Flight 114.
- In 1983, the Soviet Union shot down Korean Air Lines Flight 007.
- In 1988, the United States shot down Iran Air Flight 655.
- In 2001, the Ukrainian Air Force accidentally shot down Siberia Airlines Flight 1812 during an exercise.
- In 2014, Russia shot down Malaysia Airlines Flight 17.
- In 2020, Iran shot down Ukraine International Airlines Flight 752.

== Accident survivability ==
Earlier tragedy investigations and improved engineering have allowed many safety improvements that have allowed increasingly safer aviation.

=== Airport design ===
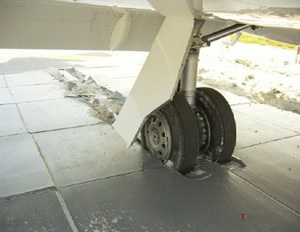
EMAS bed after being run over by landing gear

Airport design and location can have a large impact on aviation safety, especially since some airports such as Chicago Midway International Airport were originally built for propeller planes and many airports are in congested areas where it is difficult to meet newer safety standards. For instance, the FAA issued rules in 1999 calling for a runway safety area, usually extending 150 metres (500 ft) to each side and 300 metres (1,000 ft) beyond the end of a runway. This is intended to cover ninety percent of the cases of an aircraft leaving the runway by providing a buffer space free of obstacles. Many older airports do not meet this standard. One method of substituting for the 300 metres (1,000 ft) at the end of a runway for airports in congested areas is to install an engineered materials arrestor system (EMAS). These systems are usually made of lightweight, crushable concrete that absorbs the energy of the aircraft to bring it to a rapid stop. As of 2008, they have stopped three aircraft at JFK Airport.

=== Emergency airplane evacuations ===
According to a 2000 report by the National Transportation Safety Board, emergency aircraft evacuations happen about once every 11 days in the U.S. While some situations are extremely dire, such as when the plane is on fire, in many cases the greatest challenge for passengers can be the use of the evacuation slide. In a Time article on the subject, Amanda Ripley reported that when a new supersized Airbus A380 underwent mandatory evacuation tests in 2006, thirty-three of the 873 evacuating volunteers got hurt. While the evacuation was considered a success, one volunteer suffered a broken leg, while the remaining 32 received slide burns. Such accidents are common. In her article, Ripley provided tips on how to make it down the airplane slide without injury. Another improvement to airplane evacuations is the requirement by the Federal Aviation Administration for planes to demonstrate an evacuation time of 90 seconds with half the emergency exits blocked for each type of airplane in their fleet. According to studies, 90 seconds is the time needed to evacuate before the plane starts burning, before there can be a very large fire or explosions, or before fumes fill the cabin.

=== Aircraft materials and design ===
Changes such as using new materials for seat fabric and insulation has given between 40 and 60 additional seconds to people on board to evacuate before the cabin gets filled with fire and potentially deadly fumes. Other improvements through the years include the use of properly rated seatbelts, impact resistant seat frames, and airplane wings and engines designed to shear off to absorb impact forces.

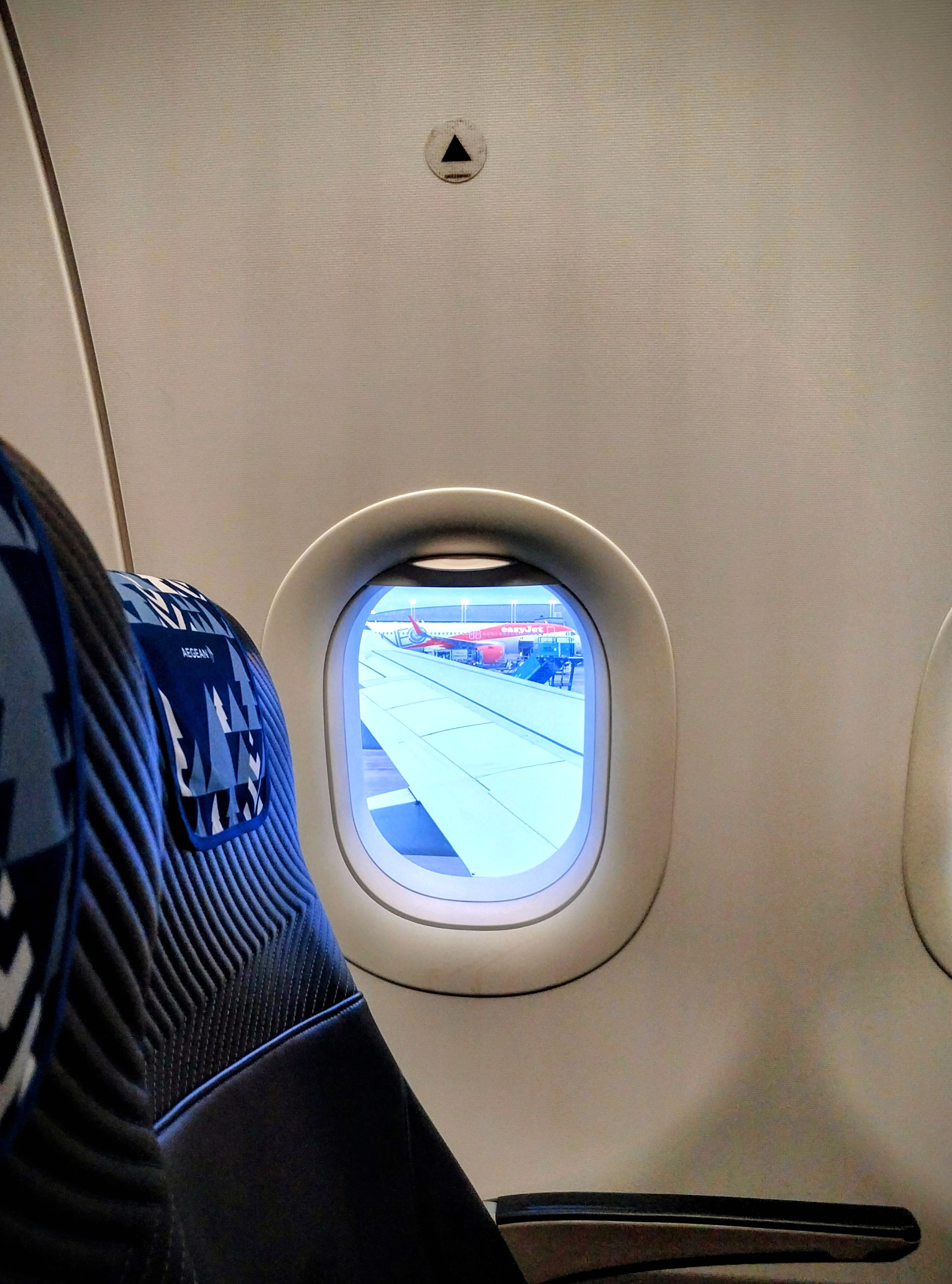
The small black triangle marks the location of the "Inspector’s Window," the specific seat that provides the most unobstructed view of the aircraft's wing. It serves the crew to confirm de-icing, inspect the flaps and slats, and check for engine smoke, sparks, or structural damage.

=== Radar and wind shear detection systems ===
As a result of the accidents due to wind shear and other weather disturbances, most notably the 1985 crash of Delta Air Lines Flight 191, the U.S. Federal Aviation Administration mandated that all commercial aircraft have on-board wind shear detection systems by 1993. Since 1995, the number of major civil aircraft accidents caused by wind shear has dropped to approximately one every ten years, due to the mandated on-board detection as well as the addition of Doppler weather radar units on the ground (NEXRAD). The installation of high-resolution Terminal Doppler Weather Radar stations at many U.S. airports that are commonly affected by wind shear has further aided the ability of pilots and ground controllers to avoid wind shear conditions.

== Accidents and incidents ==
- List of airship accidents
- Lists of aviation accidents and incidents
- Aviation accidents and incidents
- List of airliner shootdown incidents
- Flight recorder, includes flight data recorder and cockpit voice recorder

=== National investigation organizations ===
- Australian Transport Safety Bureau
- Flugunfalluntersuchungsstelle im BMVIT (Austria)
- Centro de Investigação e Prevenção de Acidentes Aeronáuticos (Brazil)
- Transportation Safety Board of Canada
- Air Accidents Investigation Institute (Czech Republic)
- Danish Aircraft Accident Investigation Board
- Bureau d'Enquêtes et d'Analyses pour la sécurité de l'Aviation Civile (France)
- Bundesstelle für Flugunfalluntersuchung (Germany)
- Aircraft Accident Investigation Bureau (India)
- KNKT - Komite Nasional Keselamatan Transportasi (Indonesia)
- International Civil Aviation Organization
- Air Accident Investigation Unit (Ireland)
- Agenzia Nazionale per la Sicurezza del Volo (Italy)
- Aircraft and Railway Accidents Investigation Commission (Japan)
- Civil Aviation Authority of New Zealand
- Transport Accident Investigation Commission (New Zealand)
- Onderzoeksraad voor Veiligheid (The Netherlands)
- Civil Aviation Authority of the Philippines
- South African Civil Aviation Authority (South Africa)
- Comisión de Investigación de Accidentes e Incidentes de Aviación Civil (Spain)
- Swedish Accident Investigation Board
- Aircraft Accident Investigation Bureau (Switzerland)
- Air Accidents Investigation Branch (UK)
- National Transportation Safety Board (USA)
- European Co-ordination Center for Aircraft Incident Reporting Systems (ECCAIRS)

== Air safety investigators ==
Air safety investigators are trained and authorized to investigate aviation accidents and incidents: to research, analyse, and report their conclusions. They may be specialized in flight operations, training, aircraft structures, air traffic control, flight recorders or human factors. They are employed by government organizations responsible for aviation safety, manufacturers or unions, though only government organizations have statutory powers to investigate.

== Safety improvement initiatives ==
The safety improvement initiatives are aviation safety partnerships between regulators, manufacturers, operators, professional unions, research organizations, and international aviation organizations to further enhance safety. Some major safety initiatives worldwide are:

- Commercial Aviation Safety Team (CAST) in the United States. The Commercial Aviation Safety Team (CAST) was founded in 1998 with a goal to reduce the commercial aviation fatality rate in the United States by 80 percent by 2007.
- U.S. Helicopter Safety Team (USHST) in the United States. The USHST was formed in 2013 as a regional partner within the International Helicopter Safety Team (IHST) to lead a government and industry cooperative effort to promote safety and work to reduce civil helicopter accidents and fatalities.
- European Strategic Safety Initiative (ESSI). The European Strategic Safety Initiative (ESSI) is an aviation safety partnership between the European Union Aviation Safety Agency (EASA), other regulators and the industry. The initiative's objective is to further enhance safety for citizens in Europe and worldwide through safety analysis, implementation of cost-effective action plans, and coordination with other safety initiatives worldwide.
- After the disappearance of Malaysia Airlines Flight 370, in June 2014, the International Air Transport Association said it was working on implementing new measures to track aircraft in flight in real time. A special panel was considering a range of options including the production of equipment especially designed to ensure real-time tracking.

Since pilot error accounts for between one-third and 60% of aviation accidents, advances in automation and technology could replace some or all of the duties of the aircraft pilots. Automation since the 1980s has already eliminated the need for flight engineers. In complex situations with severely degraded systems, the problem-solving and judgment capability of humans is challenging to achieve with automated systems, for example the catastrophic engine failures experienced by United Airlines Flight 232 and Qantas Flight 32. However, with more accurate software modeling of aeronautic factors, test planes have been successfully flown in these conditions.

While the accident rate is very low, to ensure they do not rise with the air transport growth, experts recommend creating a robust culture of collecting information from employees without blame.

== Regulators ==
- Australia: Civil Aviation Safety Authority
- Canada: Transport Canada
- European Union: European Aviation Safety Agency
- India: Directorate General of Civil Aviation (India)
- Indonesia: Directorate General of Civil Aviation (Indonesia)
- Ireland: Irish Aviation Authority
- Philippines: Civil Aviation Authority of the Philippines
- United Kingdom: Civil Aviation Authority
- United States: Federal Aviation Administration
  - Federal Aviation Regulations

== Navigation and procedural innovation ==
Advancements in satellite navigation, digital flight data, and instrument flight procedure design have significantly contributed to reducing controlled flight into terrain (CFIT) incidents. Implementation of WAAS/LPV and RNP approaches provides improved vertical guidance, while PBN-based helicopter procedures enhance safety during low-visibility and low-altitude operations.

== See also ==
- Air traffic control
- Aircraft fire trainer
- Aircraft hijacking
- Airport security
- Aviation Safety Network (ASN)
- Aviation Safety Reporting System
- Ballistic parachute
- Crashworthiness
- Chicago Convention on International Civil Aviation
- Hazard analysis
- Health hazards of air travel
- IATA Operational Safety Audit
- Incident pit, conceptual model from diving for explaining incident development and recovery
- Jet Airliner Crash Data Evaluation Centre (JACDEC)
- Lasers and aviation safety
- Mid-air collision
- Pilot error
- Safety of emergency medical services flights
- Sensory illusions in aviation
- Sixty second review, a technique used by flight attendants to focus and prepare for a sudden emergency
- SKYbrary
- Swiss cheese model
- System accident
- Tombstone mentality
- Travel § Safety
- Uncontrolled decompression
- Wind shear
- Zonal safety analysis
