= Single pilot operations =

Proposal for commercial flights operated with one pilot

Single pilot operations (SPO) is a proposal for commercial flights operated with one pilot, where previously two would be required.

Single pilot operations will require improvements in technology including aircraft and cockpit design, and changes to pilot training. Safety must be proved to win acceptance by regulators and the public.

== History ==
Historically, large aircraft required several personnel on the flight deck, such as a navigator, a flight engineer, and a dedicated radio operator. Improvements in automation, reliability and technology such as autopilot and satellite navigation have enabled modern large aircraft to operate safely with only two pilots on duty.

With further technological improvements, it may be possible safely to reduce crew requirements to one, providing cost savings.

The European Union Aviation Safety Agency (EASA) has been investigating Extended Minimum Crew Operations (eMCO), where an aircraft could be operated by one pilot in the cruise. This would be an initial requirement before single pilot operations might be allowed at a later stage. The research project runs from 2022 to 2025. Airbus and Dassault have expressed interest in eMCO.

Airbus completed its Autonomous Taxi, Take-Off and Landing (ATTOL) project in 2020, demonstrating an autonomous flight with an A350-1000 aircraft. In 2023, Airbus project Dragonfly used a combination of normal and infrared cameras, as well as radar, to assist pilots in various situations. In 2024 Airbus began testing an autonomous aircraft taxi system called "Optimate".

== Opposition ==
Proposals for single pilot operations are opposed by several pilots' trade unions, including the International Federation of Air Line Pilots' Associations (IFALPA), the American Air Line Pilots Association (ALPA), the European Cockpit Association, and the British Air Line Pilots Association.

In their white paper, ALPA argue that two-pilot operations reduces errors through cross-checking, workload sharing and better decision-making, and provides redundancy in the case of pilot incapacitation. They argue that pilots learn from each other when working together; that pilots are more versatile than aircraft equipment and sensors; and that pilots are better at autonomous decision making. They also raise concerns about cybersecurity.

== See also ==
- Automated flight attending
- Autonomous aircraft
- Germanwings Flight 9525
- Single-pilot resource management
- Uninterruptible autopilot
