= NOTECHS =

NOTECHS is a system used to assess the non-technical skills (social and cognitive) of crew members in the aviation industry. Introduced in the late 1990s, the system has been widely used by airlines during crew selection process, picking out individuals who possess capable skills that are not directly related to aircraft controls or systems. In aviation, 70 percent of all accidents are induced from pilot error, lack of communication and decision making being two contributing factors to these accidents. NOTECHS assesses and provides feedback on the performance of pilots' social and cognitive skills to help minimize pilot error and enhance safety in the future. The NOTECHS system also aims to improve the Crew Resource Management training system.

== Structure of NOTECHS ==
Two main non-technical skills that transfer to the aircraft are social and cognitive skills. Social skills are behaviors mostly done verbally through communication, allowing crew members to discuss possible conflicts and work together to resolve problems. It heavily emphasizes teamwork, a critical component for an effective operation of aircraft which impacts aviation safety. Examples of communication between crew members include acknowledging commands, conducting briefings, and conveying information, all essential components for a safe and efficient flight. The Federal Aviation Administration also announced that important areas of communication improvements include pre-flight briefings, and landing procedures. Cognitive skills are mental processes occurred for gaining situation awareness and selecting decisions, it includes tasks such as planning, prioritizing and decision making. This set of skill cannot be observed directly, but it can be inferred by examiners when pilot state a decision, an option has taken place.

A pilot with a strong cognitive mind is more proficient in emergency situations, having a bigger mental capacity to assess the situation and monitor progression on goals. The framework for NOTECHS is divided into three different levels.

1. Category
2. Element
3. Behavior Marker

=== Category ===
Social and Cognitive skills are the main non-technical skills evaluated. Both can be broken down into four different categories:

- Co-operation: Skill in which a pilot is able to work and communicate actively among group members and create a mutual working environment
- Leadership & Managerial: It focuses on pilots' ability to coordinate and manage a task, problem or direct an entire group. This exercise is usually in put in the views of a 'Pilot In Command'
- Situation Awareness: A pilot's perception of the elements in the surrounding, including the aircraft systems, external environment, time, and "the projection of their status in the future"
- Decision Making: The ability to recognize a problem, evaluate possible options and choose the final outcome.

=== Element ===
Elements are subset of a category. For example, the elements under Co-operation are: Team-building and maintaining, Considering Others, Supporting others, and Conflict Solving. All these elements tie in with the theme of being a group, communicating and cooperating as a team. The test subjects are evaluated in the following elements:

Category	Elements
Co-operation	Team building & maintaining Considering others Supporting others Conflict solving
Leadership & Managerial	Use of authority and assertiveness Providing and maintaining standards Planning and co-ordination Workload management
Situation Awareness	Awareness of aircraft systems Awareness of external environment Awareness of Time
Decision Making	Problem recognition and diagnosis Option generation Risk assessment and option selection Outcome review

=== Behavior marker ===
The NOTECHS system added the behavior markers under each element in order to "assist the examiner to describe the observed behavior in standardized and objective phraseology" It gives an indication whether a specific action in accordance to the element projects a positive or a negative impact in the overall skill.

Element	Positive behavior	Negative behavior
Considering others	Helps other crew members in demanding situations	Hesitates to offer assistance to crew members

== Rating system ==
Individuals rated through NOTECHS are given feedback on their skill performance. The results provide an indication on which categories they thrive in, and sections that need improvements. Members are evaluated in each structure element and given a rating on a five-point scale. The scale ranges from very good, good, acceptable, poor, very poor. In addition, a final overall rating is required in each element, indicating whether it was acceptable or unacceptable.

To ensure crew members are given fair and non-accidental evaluation, the Joint Aviation Authorities implemented five operating rules to follow while using NOTECHS for assessment.

1. Only observable behavior is to be assessed: A crew members' personality or emotional attitudes are ignored during the evaluation, and only visible behavior is recorded.
2. Need for Technical Consequence: To receive an unacceptable rating on a non technical skill, the flight safety must be compromised in relation to "Objective technical consequence."
3. Acceptable or Unacceptable rating required: In a situation where an examiner is ambiguous with the results of an element, a two-point rating system: ACCEPTABLE or UNACCEPTABLE, is given to finalize the test without any confusion
4. Repetition required: Showing of unacceptable behavior will lead the examiner to conduct multiple tries of the same skill test to verify it was not accidental. Repetition helps to conclude if there is a significant problem in a certain skill
5. Explanation required: For each skill given an unacceptable rating, the examiner must state why it was deemed unacceptable and how safety could have been compromised in the short and long term. A detailed explanation is helpful because it pinpoints out the specific mistakes occurred.

== Usage and relation to Crew Resource Management ==
As an assessment tool, the NOTECHS system is heavily used to evaluate crew resource management (CRM) performance. CRM is designed to teach pilots about cognitive and interpersonal skills for an effective, safe flight; the standardised taxonomy provided by NOTECHS can also be used to evaluate the effectiveness of CRM training itself. As the NOTECHS evaluation system is based on standardized conditions of acceptable skills and behaviors in a manner that can be organized by practitioners, it can be used to check whether the performance of crew members in the actual work environment has improved. Subsequently it can give guidance for further improvement of crew performance as part of line oriented flight training (LOFT).

== See also ==
- Pilot error
- Aviation safety
- Pilot decision making
