= Global Safety Information Exchange =

Aviation safety database

The Global Safety Information Exchange (GSIE) is a system launched by ICAO in September 2010 to confidentially share information about aviation safety incidents; enabling ICAO to identify trends may make it possible to improve safety through risk reduction.

== International agreements ==
In September 2009, IATA, the European Commission, and the US Department of Transportation signed an agreement for information exchange which is a foundation for the GSIE.
