= Uninterruptible autopilot =

Autopilot control system

An uninterruptible autopilot is a proposed system designed to take control of a commercial aircraft away from the pilot or flight crew in the event of a hijacking.

If implemented, the system would allow the craft to automatically guide itself to a landing at a designated airstrip. The "uninterruptible" autopilot would be activated either by pilots, by onboard sensors, or remotely via radio or satellite links by government agencies, if terrorists attempt to gain control of a flight deck. The pilots or hijackers would then be unable to regain control of the aircraft, which would automatically land safely.

A patent for the invention was awarded to Boeing in 2006.

Conspiracy theorists have claimed that the technology has been secretly fitted to some commercial airliners. Some, including historian Norman Davies, have blamed it for the disappearance of Malaysia Airlines Flight 370, the cause of which is unknown as of November 2026. According to Bob Mann, an airline industry consultant, evidence of an uninterruptible autopilot system being installed in a commercial aircraft has not been publicized and is not proven to exist. Safety concerns, including the possibility that such a system could be hacked, have prevented its roll-out.

== See also ==
- Single pilot operations
