= Pilot decision making =

Process of aviator situation handling

Pilot decision making, also known as aeronautical decision making (ADM), is a process that aviators perform to effectively handle troublesome situations that are encountered. Pilot decision-making is applied in almost every stage of the flight as it considers weather, air spaces, airport conditions, estimated time of arrival and so forth. During the flight, employers pressure pilots regarding time and fuel restrictions since a pilots’ performance directly affects the company’s revenue and brand image. This pressure often hinders a pilot's decision-making process leading to dangerous situations as 50% to 90% of aviation accidents are the result of pilot error.

== Decision-making process ==
Since the 1980s, the airline industry has identified the aeronautical decision-making (ADM) process as a critical factor in safe aeronautical operations. Airline industries are motivated to create decision-making procedures supplemented by crew resource management (CRM) to advance air safety.

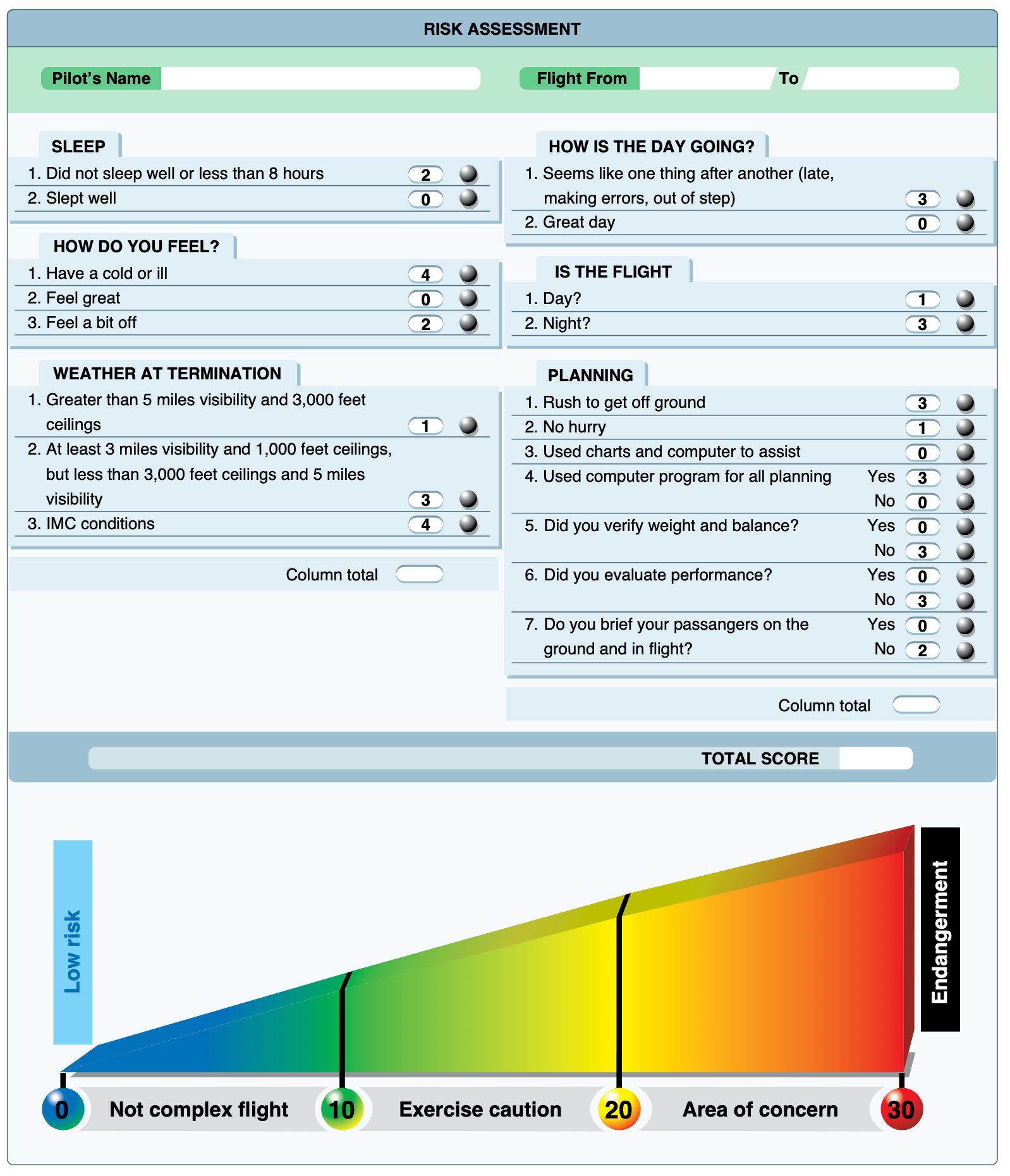
A risk assessment checklist for pilots. This program includes a wide array of aviation-related activities specific to the pilot and assesses health, fatigue, weather, capabilities, etc.

The pilot decision-making process is an effective five-step management skill that a pilot should conduct to maximize success chance when facing an unexpected or critical event. This cyclic model allows the pilot to make a critical decision and follow up with a series of events to produce the best possible resolution.

- Situation: The pilot is required to recognize the current situation and identify the possible dangers. This is the most important step of the decision-making process since detecting the situation accurately gives the critical information to start the process correctly and produce a feasible resolution to the impending situation.
- Options: Generate any possible option regardless of the feasibility of success. It is most important to create as many options as possible since there will be a larger pool of options to choose the most appropriate solution to the situation.
- Choose: From the options generated, the pilot is required to choose a course of action assessing the risks and viability.
- Act: Act upon the plan while flying in accordance with safety and time availability. The most important step of this process is time, as the pilot is challenged against time to fix the problem before the situation further deteriorates.
- Evaluate: Ask the question, "Has the selected action been successful?" and evaluate your plan to prepare for future occurrences.

=== Mnemonics ===
Pilots use mnemonics to help them deal with emergencies and unexpected situations. One of the most famous mnemonics is the phrase "Aviate, Navigate, Communicate", to remind pilots what their priorities should be. The first priority is to keep the aircraft flying, avoiding undesired aircraft states and controlled flight into terrain. Next the pilot(s) should verify their location and navigate towards a suitable destination. Communication with air traffic control, while important, is a lower priority.

Mnemonics used to decide and carry out a course of action include T-DODAR (Time, Diagnose, Options, Decision, Assign, Review), FOR-DEC (Facts, Options, Risks and benefits, Decide, Execute, Check), DECIDE (Detect, Estimate, Choose, Identify, Do, Evaluate), DESIDE (Detect, Estimate, Set safety objectives, Identify, Do, Evaluate), GRADE (Gather Information, Review Information, Analyse Alternatives, Decide, Evaluate), 3P (Perceive, Process, Perform), and PIOSEE (Problem, Information, Options, Select, Execute, Evaluate).

FOR-DEC was developed by the German Aerospace Center for Lufthansa German Airlines in 1994, and is used by numerous European airlines, as well as in German nuclear power plants. In developing this model, the authors drew on Heckhause’s concept of volitional action phases. The hyphen in FOR-DEC is designed to make the pilots pause for a moment to reconsider whether they might have overlooked relevant facts or benefitial options. T-DODAR is used by British Airways, who added the initial T to remind pilots to consider time available before starting the decision-making process. In FOR-DEC, awareness of the available time is part of initlal phase FACTS.

Advantages of these techniques include that they force the crew to name the facts; they prevent jumping to conclusions; they give co-pilots a means to make their voice heard; they allow both pilots to participate in the decision-making process; and they enable the captain to withdraw an incorrect decision without losing leadership authority. Disadvantages include that they can be an obstacle to quick and "obvious" actions; they are used as a tool for justification rather than decision; that they don't provide a way to communicate non-communicable knowledge such as intuitions and "gut feelings". If the applied decision guideline is standardised across an airline, so everyone is speaking the same language, it will also facilitate collective decision making.

SHOR (Stimuli, Hypotheses, Options, Response) can be used in time-pressured situations.

NITS (Nature, Intentions, Time, Special Instructions) can be used to brief during an emergency, for example to brief the cabin crew.

== Difficulties ==
=== Fatigue ===
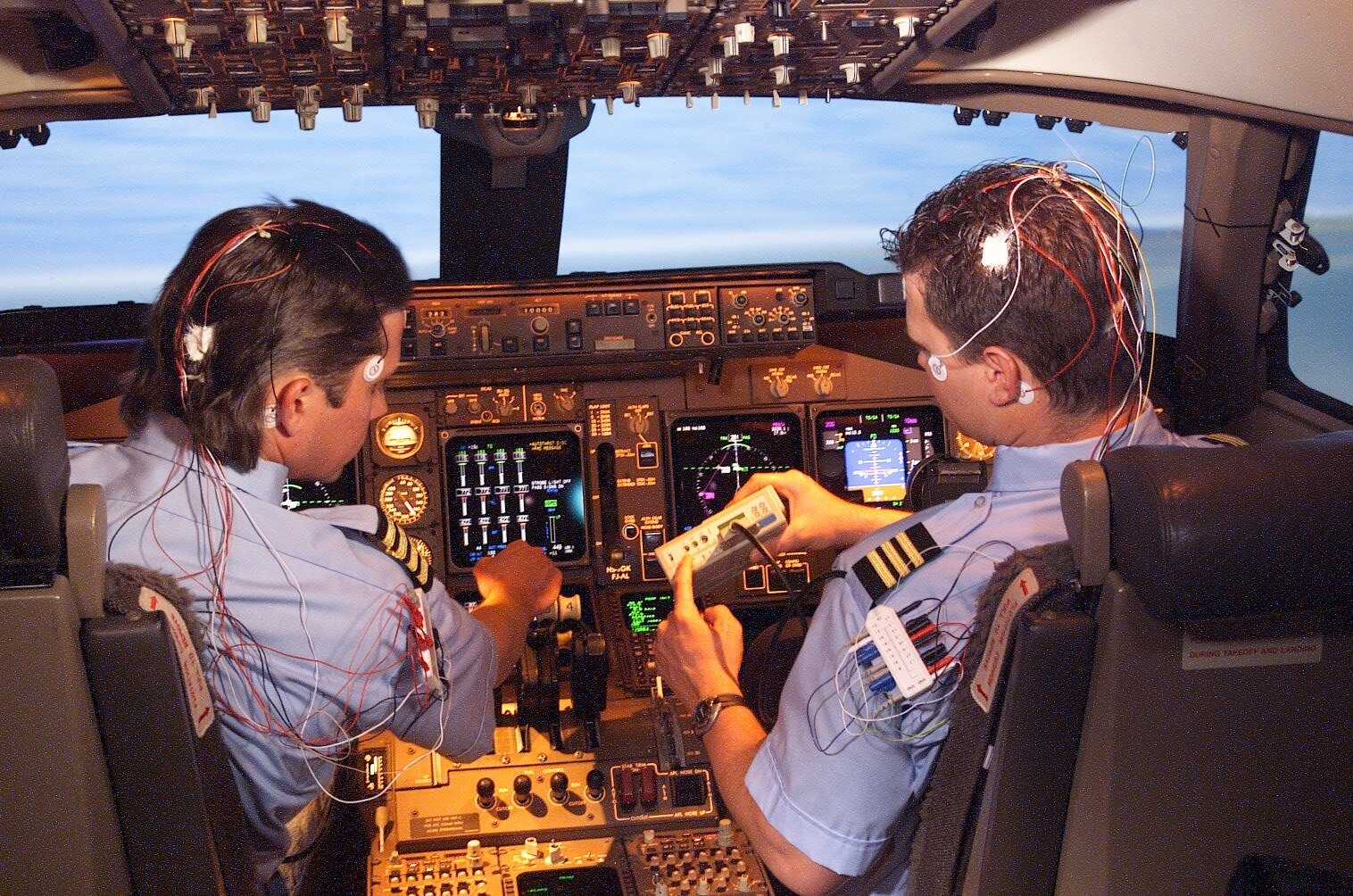
Study was conducted on how fatigue affects pilot's decision-making process

Fatigue poses a significant issue in the aviation industry with the increase in demand for long-haul missions. Fatigue is especially detrimental to decision-making tasks, awareness-related tasks, and planning, which are the fundamental skills for pilots to operate their aircraft. This situation is especially dangerous since 26% of pilots deny the effect of fatigue. The official statistics showed a percentage of 4% to 8% of aviation accidents related to fatigue. However, since fatigue lowers the performance of pilots and cripples their decision making process, fatigue impacts a much larger percentage of aviation accidents. The effects of fatigue are amplified with the changes in time zones due to jet lag disrupting biorhythm.

=== Fatigue related accidents ===
- On August 6, 1997, Korean Air Flight 801 descended into terrain short of the runway at A.B. Won Pat Airport, killing 228 of the 254 passengers and crew. The NTSB report cites the captain's fatigue as a contributing factor to his failure to execute the approach correctly.
- On October 19, 2004, Corporate Airlines Flight 5966 collided with trees short of the runway in Kirksville Regional Airport. After the NTSB investigations, the pilots of flight 5966 neglected the approach procedures due to extremely fatigued conditions from six consecutive days of flying with 14 hours of duty and 16 hours of being awake.
- On February 12, 2009, Colgan Air Flight 3407 scheduled from Newark, New Jersey to Buffalo, New York entered an aerodynamic stall during approach and crashed into a house killing all 49 passengers, aircrew, as well as one person inside the house. Investigations show the pilots' judgments were impaired due to fatigue as both pilots stayed at Newark airport overnight and all day before their flight.
- On May 22, 2010, Air India Express Flight 812 overshot the runway and fell off the cliff resulting in the plane catching fire, ultimately killing 158 people. Reports state that the captain of the flight was sleeping for a large portion of the flight and woke up shortly before the landing. The captain was experiencing sleep inertia due to fatigue.

=== Pressure ===
During the flight, pilots are required to execute a specific departure and arrival time as the inability to meet these requirements results in the companies' increased fuel cost, delayed gate time fees, and delayed flights. These factors place pilots in a situation where their job performance directly correlates to the revenue of the employee company. This leads to high amounts of stress and pressure, which causes impairment in performance.

There are significant difficulties presented during the phases associated with take-off and landing. The maneuvering process to approach and landing combined only accounts for 17% of the average flight time but is responsible for 70.2% of total aviation accidents. Statistics prove a significantly larger number of accident occurrences during the phases where pilots are in stressed and pressured situations. At these phases, pilot decision-making can be critical. For example, the pilots of Asiana Airlines flight 214 were in a pressured and fatigued situation when they failed to go around after detecting a low approach path and high airspeed on the final approach.

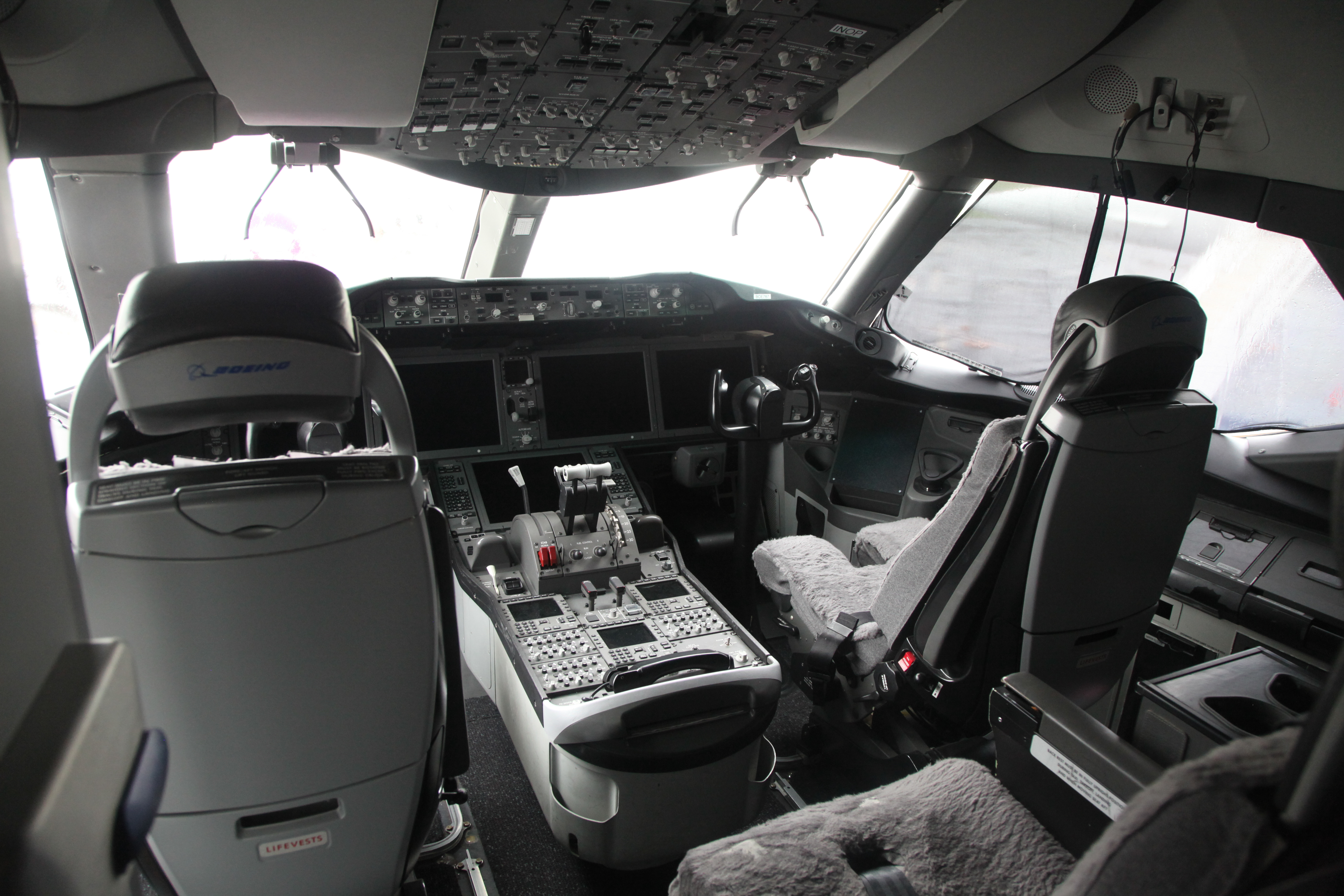
With the advancement in aviation technology, pilots fall into automation bias

=== Automation bias ===
The advancement in technology has enabled tasks that are too complex for humans and extended human capabilities. Automation such as GPS, traffic alert, and autopilot, has been incorporated into aviation and has become one of the prime resources for critical decision making. With the sophistication and accuracy of current technology, humans have been relying on it excessively, which results in automation bias. Referenced from Human-Computer Studies, an experiment was conducted to measure the effects of automation bias on decision making. Two control groups were selected to monitor a specific task, with the first group having access to reliable automation aid and the second group with no access to aid. The results showed that the second group in non-automated settings outperformed their counterpart. The first group made more errors when not explicitly prompted by automation, moreover, they followed the instruction of automation even when it contradicted their decision. This experiment shows the example of automation bias and participants' high degree of obedience to automation. Automation bias can lead to critical errors in pilot decision making, as it is one of the many difficulties in today's digital age.

== Weather decision ==
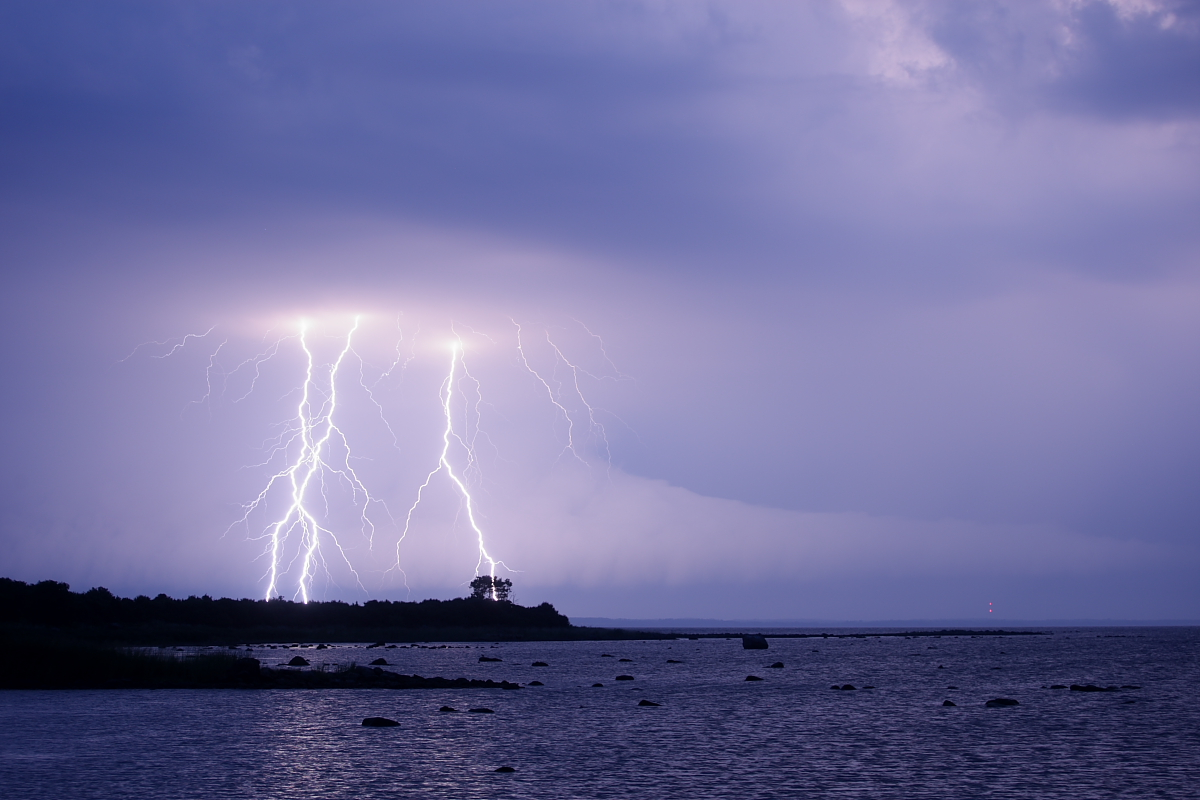
VFR pilots flying into IFR conditions leads to high accident rate

For the pilots flying under visual flight rule (VFR, in weather conditions clear enough to allow the pilot to see where the aircraft is going), it is significant to perform correct decision-making for the weather as they have to stay within the specific VFR weather requirements. The pilot must make a ‘go’ or ‘no-go’ decision as to if he or she will embark on a flight and if they will continue on the flight when the weather deteriorates.

VFR pilots primarily navigate by using the GPS, radio navigation systems, and most importantly pilotage. In order to perform pilotage, pilots must visually see the ground features and reference it to the map. Accidents are inevitable when weather conditions require pilots to fly primarily by reference to flight instruments without the proper instrument flight rules (IFR) equipments. In fact, over 19% of the general aviation crashes are caused from flying VFR in bad weather and 72% of these crashes are fatal.

The research conducted by David O'Hare and Tracy Smitheram on pilots' decision-making in deteriorating conditions demonstrates the application of behavioral psychology to pilots. The experiment was conducted in a simulator where VFR pilots were presented with scenarios of cross-country flights in marginal weather. Participants of this experiment were measured by how their perspective of anticipated gains or losses affected the decision-making process. Results showed that the pilots who viewed decision making in the anticipated gains framework were significantly less likely to press on to deteriorating weather than the ones that were viewed in the losses framework. This research shows that people are risk-averse when situations are viewed in terms of gains. It is important to compare the marginal benefit of pressing on into deteriorating weather to the risk associated with the flight to make the correct decision.

Commercial pilots and their associated airlines also have to contend with company expectations during their decision-making process regarding the weather. Commercial aircraft have higher capabilities for harsh weather, but their risk is significantly greater due to the passenger safety requirements and the sheer cost of the aircraft. Each airline has a different tolerance for weather, which poses problems for airlines that have more lenient protocols. Pilots are pressured to make a decision when canceling the flight, which could lead to a loss in reputation and revenue for the companies.

== Emergencies ==
When pilots encounter emergencies, a checklist is referenced to follow a specific procedure to overcome the situation. However, not all parts of the emergency checklist explicitly state the qualitative actions that a pilot needs to perform. For example, in a forced landing, the pilot is required to choose a field to commit for landing, which requires the decision-making process to take into account winds, field quality, obstacles, distance, civilization, and other associated factors. The decision-making process is important as pilots are required to measure and compare the risks associated with each option. Four key conditions are required for an effective emergency decision.

- Awareness of serious risks if no protective action is taken
- Awareness of serious risks if any of the salient protective action is taken
- Positive mindset to find information and advice to create a solution
- Mental belief that there is sufficient time to search and deliberate before a serious threat occurs

It is important that if any of these conditions are absent, a defensive avoidance or hyper vigilance becomes prevalent and aggravates the decision making process. This theoretical model developed from psychological research provides a basis for pilots when confronting an emergency situation.

== See also ==
- Decision-making
- Crew resource management
- Single-pilot resource management
- Aviation safety
- Aerospace psychology
- Pilot error
- Pilot deviation
- NOTECHS, a system used to assess the non-technical skills in aviation
- Incident pit, conceptual model from diving for explaining incident development and recovery
