= Cranfield Institute =

The Cranfield Institute for Safety, Risk, and Reliability, commonly referred as The Cranfield Institute, is a part of Cranfield University in Cranfield, Bedfordshire, England, UK. It is primarily a teaching and research facility, but also offers safety-related consultancy to businesses.

== Facilities ==
The Cranfield Institute has several simulators designed for risk and hazard assessment and research. They have two aircraft cabin simulators (the Large Cabin Evacuation Simulator and Boeing 737 Cabin Simulator). They also have a driving simulator and the Cranfield Impact Centre Laboratories, which provides both static and dynamic impact testing.

== Cranfield and the aviation industry ==
Following the Kegworth Air Disaster the United Kingdom Civil Aviation Authority (CAA) commissioned the Cranfield Institute to research a best brace position for passengers in an air crash. This research was conducted by the Cranfield Impact Centre Laboratories using both their impact sled and computer modelling.

Cranfield also conducted research on behalf of the CAA after the Manchester Air Disaster to assess why so many passengers were unable to make it to the emergency exits safely. This research prompted changes to cabin layouts in the UK, including making overwing exits more accessible in an emergency by improving seat layout, forcing the installation of emergency floor lighting to assist in a smoke-filled cabin and widening of bulkhead passageways to prevent bottle-necking of evacuating passengers.
