= Aircraft fire trainer =

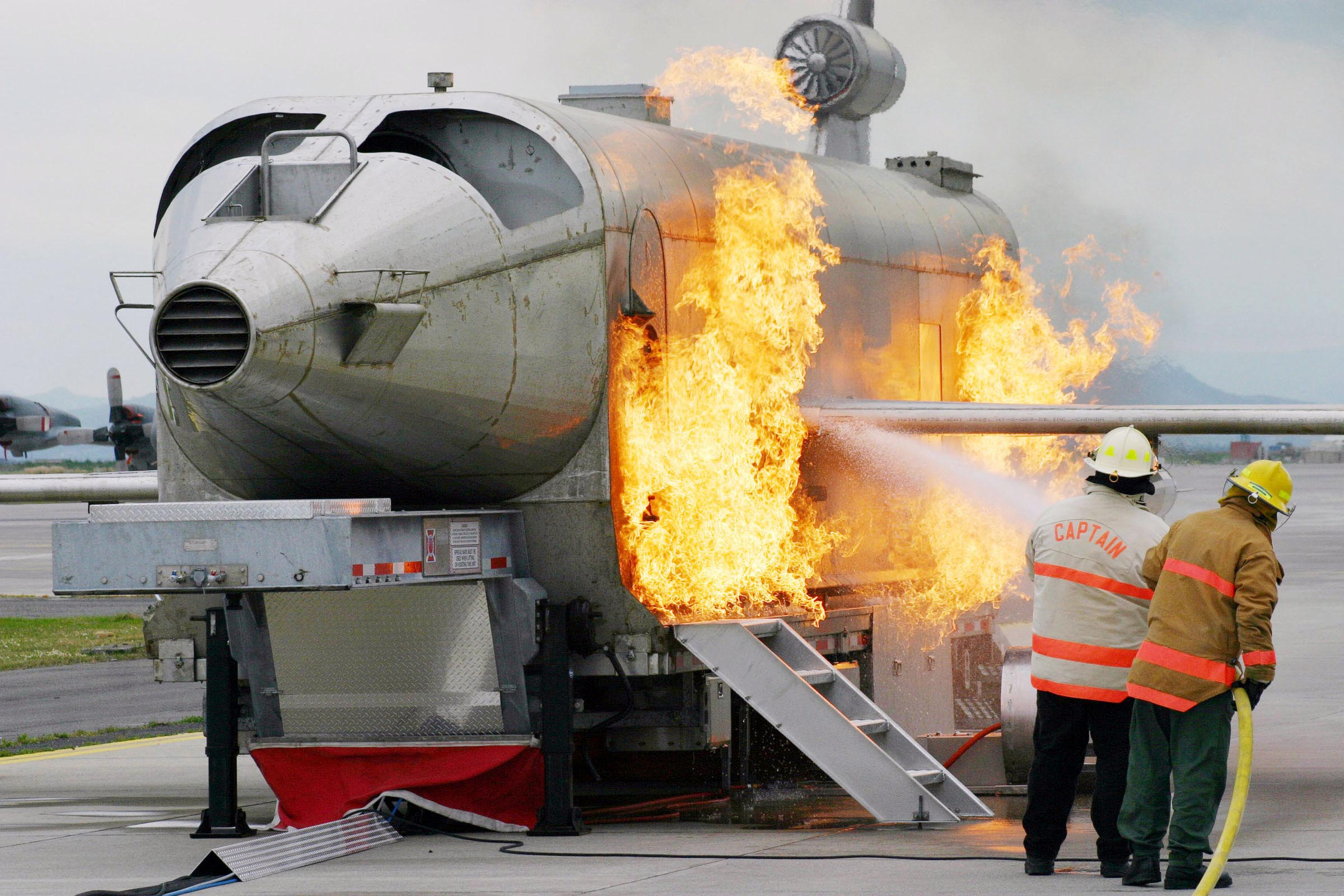
US Navy personnel using an aircraft fire trainer

An aircraft fire trainer is a firefighting simulator designed to practice rescue of passengers and crew during an aircraft accident. Aircraft fire training simulators allow firefighters to recreate different emergency scenarios such as large-scale external fuel spill, wing, engine and tail fires. They can also help develop realistic internal rescue scenarios for seat, cockpit, cabin and cargo fires. Fire training simulators also offer flexibility for the right training activity while providing maximum safety at all times. They are used by municipal, industrial fire and rescue departments, international airports and the military throughout the world. Ground collisions and accidents can be created as part of a large-scale training exercise involving fire, ambulance and police crews, ground staff and air crews. In addition, secondary incidents can be developed providing training on controlling incidents that can occur around the aircraft. Every activity is managed and viewed from the control tower.

When aircraft crash, specialized firefighting and rescue tactics are required. However, using multi-million-dollar aircraft is not viable, even for the largest companies. Full-size mock-ups of several types of aircraft exist that are realistic training tools. These are dramatically less expensive to produce and are reusable.
