= Single-pilot resource management =

Cockpit management methodology for single pilots

Single-pilot resource management (SRM) is defined as the art and science of managing all the resources (both on-board the aircraft and from outside sources) available to a single-pilot (prior and during flight) to ensure that the successful outcome of the flight is never in doubt. SRM includes the concepts of Aeronautical Decision Making (ADM), Risk Management (RM), Task Management (TM), Automation Management (AM), Controlled Flight Into Terrain (CFIT) Awareness, and Situational Awareness (SA). SRM training helps the pilot maintain situational awareness by managing the automation and associated aircraft control and navigation tasks. This enables the pilot to accurately assess and manage risk and make accurate and timely decisions.

SRM is an adaptation of crew resource management (CRM) training to single-pilot operations. The purpose of SRM is to reduce the number of aviation accidents caused by human error by teaching pilots about their own human limitations and how to maximize their performance. The initiative for this training began in 2005 when the NBAA published training guidelines for single-pilot operations of very light jets (VLJs). However, the application of SRM is not limited to VLJ pilots. This training applies to all single-pilot flights in general aviation (GA).

In the United States, GA accounts for 96% of aircraft, 60% of flight hours. It also accounts for 94% of fatal aviation accidents, Airline and military aviation estimates of the number of accidents caused by pilot error range from 70-80% - these are the statistics that SRM seeks to reduce.

== 5P Approach to SRM ==
A structured approach to SRM helps pilots learn to gather information, analyze it, and make sound decisions on the conduct of the flight. To get the greatest benefit from SRM, the single-pilot needs a practical framework for application in day-to-day flying. One such approach involves regular evaluation of: Plan, Plane, Pilot, Passengers, and Programming.

== Training ==
The content of SRM is similar to that of CRM training, except the topics relating to pilot crews are excluded (ex. captain and co-pilot communication). Examples of topics included in SRM training are situational awareness, workload management, automation management, and aeronautical decision making.

The University of Western Ontario is a leader in SRM and is researching how to deliver SRM training online. A major research investigation at UWO recently proved that online SRM training improves pilot situational awareness. This investigation involved 36 licensed pilots completing SRM training followed by a performance evaluation in a high-fidelity Cessna 172 flight simulator.

== See also ==
- Single pilot operations
