= European integration =

Process of integration of states in and around Europe

European integration is the process of political, legal, social, regional and economic integration of states wholly or partially in Europe, or nearby. European integration has primarily but not exclusively come about through the European Union (EU) and its policies, and can include cultural assimilation and centralisation.

The history of European integration is marked by the Roman Empire's consolidation of the European continent, which set a precedent for the notion of a unified Europe. This idea was echoed through attempts at unity, such as the Holy Roman Empire, the Hanseatic League, and the First French Empire. The devastation of World War I reignited the concept of a unified Europe, leading to the establishment of international organizations aimed at political coordination across Europe. The interwar period saw politicians such as Richard von Coudenhove-Kalergi and Aristide Briand advocating for European unity, albeit with differing visions.

Post-World War II Europe saw a significant push towards integration, with Winston Churchill's call for a "United States of Europe" in 1946 being a notable example. This period saw the formation of theories around European integration, categorizing into proto-integration, explaining integration, analyzing governance, and constructing the EU, reflecting a shift from viewing European integration as a unique process, to incorporating broader international relations and comparative politics theories.

Citizens' organizations have played a role in advocating further European integration, exemplified by the Union of European Federalists and the European Movement International. Various agreements and memberships demonstrate the web of relations and commitments between European countries, showing the multi-layered nature of integration.

== History ==
In antiquity, the Roman Empire brought about integration of multiple European and Mediterranean territories. The numerous subsequent claims of succession of the Roman Empire, even the iterations of the Classical Empire and its ancient peoples, have occasionally been reinterpreted in the light of post-1950 European integration as providing inspiration and historical precedents. Important examples include the Holy Roman Empire, the Hanseatic League, the Peace of Westphalia, the Napoleonic Empire, and the unification of Germany, Italy, and the Balkans as well as the Latin Monetary Union.

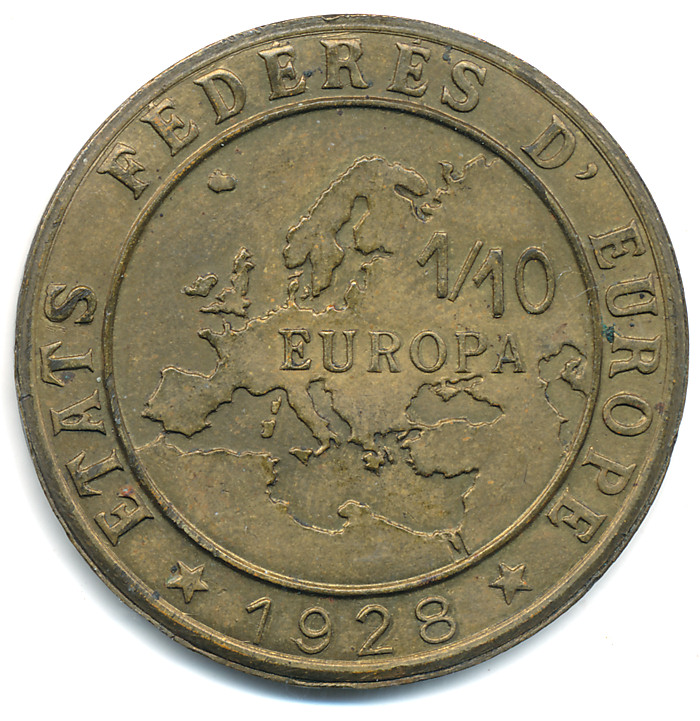
A 1928 Europa coin for the hypothetical "Federated States of Europe" (États fédérés d'Europe)

Following the catastrophe of the First World War of 1914–1918, thinkers and visionaries from a range of political traditions again began to float the idea of a politically unified Europe. In the early 1920s a range of international organisations were founded (or re-founded) to help like-minded political parties to coordinate their activities. These ranged from the Comintern (1919), to the Labour and Socialist International (1921) to the Radical and Democratic Entente of centre-left progressive parties (1924), to the Green International of farmers' parties (1923), to the centre-right International Secretariat of Democratic Parties inspired by Christianity (1925). While the remit of these international bodies was global, the predominance of political parties from Europe meant that they facilitated interaction between the adherents of a given ideology across European borders. Within each political tradition, voices emerged advocating not merely the cooperation of various national parties, but the pursuit of political institutions at the European level.

One of the first to articulate this view was Richard von Coudenhove-Kalergi, who outlined a conservative vision of European unity in his Pan-Europa manifesto (1923). The First Paneuropean Congress took place in Vienna in 1926, and the association possessed 8000 members by the time of the 1929 Wall Street crash. They envisaged a specifically Christian, and by implication Catholic, Europe. The British civil-servant and future Conservative minister Arthur Salter published a book advocating The United States of Europe in 1933.

In contrast the Soviet commissar (minister) Leon Trotsky raised the slogan "For a Soviet United States of Europe" in 1923, advocating a Europe united along communist principles.

Among liberal-democratic parties, the French centre-left undertook several initiatives to group like-minded parties from the European states. In 1927, the French mathematician and politician Émile Borel, a leader of the centre-left Radical Party and the founder of the Radical International, set up a French Committee for European Cooperation, and a further twenty countries set up equivalent committees. However, it remained an élite venture: the largest committee, the French one, possessed fewer than six-hundred members, two-thirds of them parliamentarians. Two centre-left French prime ministers went further. In 1929 Aristide Briand gave a speech in the presence of the League of Nations Assembly in which he proposed the idea of a federation of European nations based on solidarity and in the pursuit of economic prosperity and political and social co-operation. In 1930, at the League's request, Briand presented a Memorandum on the organisation of a system of European Federal Union. The next year the future French prime minister Édouard Herriot published his book The United States of Europe. Indeed, a template for such a system already existed, in the form of the 1921 Belgian and Luxembourgish customs and monetary union.

Support for the proposals by the French centre-left came from a range of prestigious figures. Many eminent economists, aware that the economic race-to-the-bottom between states was creating ever-greater instability, supported the view: these included John Maynard Keynes. The French political scientist and economist Bertrand Jouvenel remembered a widespread mood after 1924 calling for a "harmonisation of national interests along the lines of European union, for the purpose of common prosperity". The Spanish philosopher and politician, Ortega y Gasset, expressed a position shared by many within Republican Spain: "European unity is no fantasy, but reality itself; and the fantasy is precisely the opposite: the belief that France, Germany, Italy or Spain are substantive & independent realities." Eleftherios Venizelos, Prime Minister of Greece, outlined his government's support in a 1929 speech by saying that "the United States of Europe will represent, even without Russia, a power strong enough to advance, up to a satisfactory point, the prosperity of the other continents as well".

Between the two world wars, the Polish statesman Józef Piłsudski (1867–1935) envisaged the idea of a European federation that he called Międzymorze ("Intersea" or "Between-seas"), known in English as Intermarium, which was a Polish-oriented version of Mitteleuropa.

The Great Depression, the rise of fascism and communism and subsequently World War II prevented the inter-war movements from gaining further support: between 1933 and 1936 most of Europe's remaining democracies became dictatorships, and Ortega's Spain and Venizelos's Greece had both plunged into civil war. But although the social-democratic, liberal or Christian-democratic supporters of European unity were out of power during the 1930s and unable to put their ideas into practice, many would find themselves in power in the 1940s and 1950s, and better-placed to put into effect their earlier remedies against economic and political crisis.

During World War II (1939–1945) Nazi Germany came to dominate – directly or indirectly – much of Europe at various times. The plans for German-oriented political, social, and economic integration of Europe – such as the New Order, the Greater Germanic Reich and Generalplan Ost – did not survive the war.

At the end of World War II, the continental political climate favoured unity in democratic European countries, seen by many as an escape from the extreme forms of nationalism which had devastated the continent. In a speech delivered on 19 September 1946 at the University of Zürich in Switzerland, Winston Churchill postulated a United States of Europe. The same speech however contains remarks, less-often quoted, which make it clear that Churchill did not initially see Britain as being part of this United States of Europe:

We British have our own Commonwealth of Nations ... And why should there not be a European group which could give a sense of enlarged patriotism and common citizenship to the distracted peoples of this turbulent and mighty continent and why should it not take its rightful place with other great groupings in shaping the destinies of men? ... France and Germany must take the lead together. Great Britain, the British Commonwealth of Nations, mighty America[,] and I trust Soviet Russia—for then indeed all would be well—must be the friends and sponsors of the new Europe and must champion its right to live and shine.

We must build a kind of United States of Europe. In this way only, will hundreds of millions of toilers be able to regain the simple joys and hopes which make life worth living.

— Winston Churchill

== Theories of integration ==
European integration scholars Thomas Diez and Antje Wiener identify the general tendencies in the development of European integration theory and suggest to divide theories of integration into three broad phases, which are preceded by a normative proto-integration theory period. There's a gradual shift from theories studying European integration as sui generis towards new approaches that incorporate theories of International Relations and Comparative politics.

=== Proto-integration period ===
The question of how to avoid wars between the nation-states was essential for the first theories. Federalism and functionalism proposed the containment of the nation-state, while transactionalism sought to theorise the conditions for the stabilisation of the nation-state system. Early federalism was more like a political movement calling for European federation by various political actors, for example, Altiero Spinelli calling for a federal Europe in his Ventotene Manifesto, and Paul Valéry envisioning European civilization for unity. State sovereignty was an issue for federalists who hoped political organizations at higher regional level would solve the issue. A representative scholar of functionalism was David Mitrany, who also saw states and their sovereignty as a core problem and believed that one should restrain states to prevent future wars. However, Mitrany disagreed with regional integration as he viewed it as mere replication of the state-model. Transactionalism, on the other hand, sees increased cross-border exchanges as promoting regional integration so that the risk of war is reduced.

=== First phase: explaining integration, 1960s onwards ===
European integration theory initially focused on explaining integration process of supranational institution-building. One of the most influential theories of European integration is neofunctionalism, influenced by functionalist ideas, developed by Ernst B. Haas (1958) and further investigated by Leon Lindberg (1963). This theory focuses on spillovers of integration, where well-integrated and interdependent areas led to more integration. Neofunctionalism well captures the spillover from the European Coal and Steel Community to the European Economic Community established in the 1957 Treaties of Rome. Transfers of loyalties from the national level to the supranational level is expected to occur as integration progresses.

The other big influential theory in Integration Studies is Intergovernmentalism, advanced by Stanley Hoffmann after the Empty Chair Crisis by French President Charles De Gaulle in the 1960s. Intergovernmentalism and later, Liberal Intergovernmentalism, developed in the 1980s by Andrew Moravcsik focus on governmental actors' impacts that are enhanced by supranational institutions but not restrained from them. The important debate between neofunctionalism and (liberal) intergovernmentalism still remains central in understanding the development and setbacks of the European integration.

=== Second phase: analyzing governance, 1980s onwards ===
As the empirical world has changed, so have the theories and thus the understanding of European Integration. The second generation of integration theorists focused on the importance of institutions and their impacts on both integration process and European governance development. The second phase brought in perspectives from comparative politics in addition to traditional International Relations theoretical references. Studies attempted to understand what kind of polity the EU is and how it operates. For example, new theory multi-level governance (MLG) was developed to understand the workings and development of the EU.

=== Third phase: constructing the EU, 1990s onwards ===
The third phase of integration theory marked a return of International Relations theory with the rise of critical and constructivist approaches in the 1990s. Perspectives from social constructivists, post-structuralists, critical theories, feminist theories are incorporated in integration theories to conceptualize European integration process of widening and deepening.

== Citizens' organisations calling for further integration ==
Various federalist organisations have been created over time supporting the idea of a federal Europe. These include the Union of European Federalists, the Young European Federalists, the European Movement International, the European Federalist Party, and Volt Europa. The Union of European Federalists (UEF) is a European non-governmental organisation, campaigning for a Federal Europe. It consists of 20 constituent organisations and it has been active at the European, national and local levels for more than 50 years. The European Movement International is a lobbying association that coordinates the efforts of associations and national councils with the goal of promoting European integration, and disseminating information about it. The European Federalist Party is a pro-European, pan-European and federalist political party which advocates further integration of the EU and the establishment of a Federal Europe. Its aim is to gather all Europeans to promote European federalism and to participate in all elections all over Europe. It has national sections in 15 countries. Volt Europa is a pan-European and European federalist political movement that also serves as the pan-European structure for subsidiary parties in EU member states. It is present in 29 countries and participates in elections all over the EU on the local, national and European level.

== Overlap of membership in various agreements ==
A clickable Euler diagram showing the relationships between various European regional organisations

There are various agreements with overlapping membership. Several countries take part in a larger number of agreements than others.

=== Common membership of member states of the European Union ===
Each member state of the European Union (EU) is:

1. a member state of the:
  - Organization for Security and Co-operation in Europe (OSCE), Secretariat: Vienna, Austria
  - European Political Community (EPC)
  - Council of Europe (CoE), HQ: Strasbourg, France
  - European Civil Aviation Conference (ECAC), HQ: Neuilly-sur-Seine/Paris, France
  - European Organisation for the Safety of Air Navigation (Eurocontrol), HQ: Brussels, Belgium
  - European Committee for Standardization (CEN), HQ: Brussels, Belgium
  - European Telecommunications Standards Institute (ETSI), HQ: Sophia Antipolis, France
  - European Committee for Electrotechnical Standardization (CENELEC), HQ: Brussels, Belgium
  - European Union Customs Union (EUCU)
  - European Olympic Committees (EOC), HQ: Rome, Italy
  - European Patent Convention (EPC)/European Patent Organisation (EPOrg)
  - European Atomic Energy Community (EAEC, Euratom)
  - Single Euro Payments Area (SEPA)
  - European Common Aviation Area (ECAA)
  - European Higher Education Area (EHEA) – Belgium as Flemish Community and French Community, i.e. the German-speaking Community of Belgium is not included.
2. home to organizations that are members of the:
  - European Broadcasting Union (EBU), HQ: Geneva, Switzerland
  - Union of European Football Associations (UEFA), HQ: Nyon, Switzerland
  - European Network of Transmission System Operators for Electricity, HQ: Brussels, Belgium
3. home to organisations that are members, associated partners or observers of the
  - European Network of Transmission System Operators for Gas, HQ: Brussels, Belgium
4. located in the European Broadcasting Area (EBA)

=== Membership in European Union agreements ===
EU, Schengen, EMU, AFSJ (All agreements): 19 c. EU, Schengen, AFSJ: 5 c. EU, EMU, AFSJ: 1 c. EU, Schengen: 1 c. EU, EMU: 1 c. EEA, Schengen: 3 c. Schengen, Bilateral treaties: 1 c. Candidates, some agreements: 9 c. Microstates, some agreements: 4 c. Association Agreement: 1 c.

Most EU member states have joined all European treaties, instead of opting out on some. They drive the development of a federal model for the European integration. This is linked to the concept of Multi-speed Europe where some countries would create a core union; and goes back to the Inner Six references to the founding member states of the European Communities.

At present, the formation of a formal Core Europe Federation ("a federation within the confederation") has been held off at every occasion where such a federation treaty had been discussed. Instead, supranational institutions are created that govern more areas in "Inner Europe" than existing European integration provides for.

Among the 27 EU state members, 19 states have signed all integration agreements: Austria, Belgium, Bulgaria, Croatia, Finland, Estonia, France, Germany, Greece, Italy, Latvia, Lithuania, Luxembourg, Malta, Netherlands, Portugal, Slovakia, Slovenia and Spain. The agreements considered include the fifth stage of economic integration or EMU, the Schengen agreement, and the Area of freedom, security and justice (AFSJ).

Thus, among the 27 EU countries, 21 have joined the Eurozone, 25 have joined Schengen, and also 25 have no opt-outs under AFSJ.

Further, some countries which do not belong to the EU have joined several of these initiatives, albeit sometimes at a lower stage such as the Customs Union, the Common Market (EEA), or even unilaterally adopting the euro, and by taking part in Schengen, either as a signatory state, or de facto.

Thus, 6 non-EU countries have adopted the euro (4 through an agreement with the EU and 2 unilaterally), and 4 non-EU states have joined the Schengen agreement officially.

The following table shows the status of each state membership to the different agreements promoted by the EU. It lists 47 countries, including the 27 EU member states, 9 candidate states, 3 members of the EEA and Switzerland, Kosovo which has applied for membership, 4 microstates, and the United Kingdom and Armenia as special cases.

Hence, this table summarises some components of EU laws applied in most European states. Some territories of EU member states also have a special status in regard to EU laws applied. Some territories of EFTA member states also have a special status in regard to EU laws applied as is the case with some European microstates. For member states that do not have special-status territories the EU law applies fully with the exception of the opt-outs in the European Union and states under a safeguard clause or alternatively some states participate in enhanced co-operation between a subset of the EU members. Additionally, there are various examples of non-participation by some EU members and non-EU states participation in particular Agencies of the European Union, the programmes for European Higher Education Area, European Research Area and Erasmus Mundus.

European Union Agreements
State	Map	EU	EEA	Customs Union	Schengen	EMU (Euro)	AFSJ
Austria		Yes	Yes	Yes	Yes	Yes	Yes
Belgium		Yes	Yes	Yes	Yes	Yes	Yes
Bulgaria		Yes	Yes	Yes	Yes	Yes	Yes
Croatia		Yes	Yes	Yes	Yes	Yes	Yes
Estonia		Yes	Yes	Yes	Yes	Yes	Yes
Finland		Yes	Yes	Yes	Yes	Yes	Yes
France		Yes	Yes	Yes	Yes	Yes	Yes
Germany		Yes	Yes	Yes	Yes	Yes	Yes
Greece		Yes	Yes	Yes	Yes	Yes	Yes
Italy		Yes	Yes	Yes	Yes	Yes	Yes
Latvia		Yes	Yes	Yes	Yes	Yes	Yes
Lithuania		Yes	Yes	Yes	Yes	Yes	Yes
Luxembourg		Yes	Yes	Yes	Yes	Yes	Yes
Malta		Yes	Yes	Yes	Yes	Yes	Yes
Netherlands		Yes	Yes	Yes	Yes	Yes	Yes
Portugal		Yes	Yes	Yes	Yes	Yes	Yes
Slovakia		Yes	Yes	Yes	Yes	Yes	Yes
Slovenia		Yes	Yes	Yes	Yes	Yes	Yes
Spain		Yes	Yes	Yes	Yes	Yes	Yes
Czech Republic		Yes	Yes	Yes	Yes	Obliged to join	Yes
Hungary		Yes	Yes	Yes	Yes	Obliged to join	Yes
Poland		Yes	Yes	Yes	Yes	Obliged to join	CFR partial opt-out
Romania		Yes	Yes	Yes	Yes	Obliged to join	Yes
Sweden		Yes	Yes	Yes	Yes	Obliged to join	Yes
Cyprus		Yes	Yes	Yes	Obliged to join	Yes	Yes
Denmark		Yes	Yes	Yes	Yes	Opt-out, ERM II	Opt-out
(Republic of Ireland) Ireland		Yes	Yes	Yes	Opt-out, Visa Free	Yes	Opt-out (Opt-in)
Liechtenstein		No	Yes	No (Swiss-Liecht CU)	Yes	No	No
Norway		Applications withdrawn	Yes	No	Yes	No	No
Iceland		Applications withdrawn	Yes	No	Yes	No	No
Switzerland		Application withdrawn	Bilateral treaties	No (Swiss-Liecht CU)	Yes	No	No
Albania		Candidate	No, EC, ECAA	No	No, Visa Free	No	No
Bosnia and Herzegovina		Candidate	No, EC, ECAA	No	No, Visa Free	No	No
(Georgia (country)) Republic of Georgia		Candidate	No, EC, ECAA	No	No, Visa Free	No	No
Moldova		Candidate	No, EC, ECAA	No	No, Visa Free	No	No
Montenegro		Candidate	No, EC, ECAA	No	No, Visa Free	Unilaterally adopted	No
North Macedonia		Candidate	No, EC, ECAA	No	No, Visa Free	No	No
Serbia		Candidate	No, EC, ECAA	No	No, Visa Free	No	No
Turkey		Candidate	No	Customs Union (Note: In a customs union with the EU.)	No	No	No
Ukraine		Candidate	No, EC, ECAA	No	No, Visa Free	No	No
Andorra		No	No	Customs Union	No, Visa Free	Yes (Note: Formal agreement with the EU to issue euros.)	No
Monaco		No	No	de facto, with France	de facto, with France	Yes	No
San Marino		No	No	Customs Union	Open border	Yes	No
Vatican City		No	No	No	Open border	Yes	No
Kosovo		Applicant, SAA signed	No, EC, ECAA	No	No, Visa Free	Unilaterally adopted	No
Armenia		No ( CEPA signed )	No, EC, ECAA	No	No	No	No
United Kingdom		No (withdrew)	No (withdrew)	No	No, Visa Free	No	No

=== Most integrated countries ===
Map of Eurozone and ERM II without opt-out

21 states are part of the Eurozone or in ERM II without Euro opt-out.

These are Austria, Belgium, Bulgaria, Croatia, Cyprus, Estonia, Finland, France, Germany, Greece, Italy, Ireland, Latvia, Lithuania, Luxembourg, Malta, the Netherlands, Portugal, Slovakia, Slovenia and Spain.

They are all members of or take part in:

- the European Union
- the European Defence Agency (EDA)
- the European Economic Area (EEA)

Countries in the Eurozone or in ERM II without Euro opt-out
Eurozone since:				1999	1999	1999	1999	1999	1999	1999	1999	1999	1999	1999	2001	2007	2008	2008	2009	2011	2014	2015	2023	2026
Benelux/ WU/ WEU/ EC/ EU since:				1948	1948	1948	1948	1951	1951	1973	1986	1986	1995	1995	1981	2004	2004	2004	2004	2004	2004	2004	2013	2007
Rule not met	EU only	Comment	Qty	BE	LU	NL	FR	DE	IT	IE	ES	PT	AT	FI	GR	SI	CY	MT	SK	EE	LV	LT	HR	BG
Quantity total:			245	4	10	6	1	3	5	21	3	8	9	12	11	10	24	24	11	14	17	17	19	16
PESCO	yes		1	0	0	0	0	0	0	0	0	0	0	0	0	0	0	1	0	0	0	0	0	0
is a member state of the Council of Europe Development Bank	no		1	0	0	0	0	0	0	0	0	0	1	0	0	0	0	0	0	0	0	0	0	0
did implement the EUCARIS system	no	PT is preparing, AT is not party to the EUCARIS Treaty (2000) as such	1	0	0	0	0	0	0	0	0	1	0	0	0	0	0	0	0	0	0	0	0	0
European Public Prosecutor's Office (EPPO)	yes		1	0	0	0	0	0	0	1	0	0	0	0	0	0	0	0	0	0	0	0	0	0
AFSJ	yes	IE has flexible opt-in	1	0	0	0	0	0	0	1	0	0	0	0	0	0	0	0	0	0	0	0	0	0
uses UIC gauge for existing or planned high-speed rail	no		1	0	0	0	0	0	0	0	0	0	0	1	0	0	0	0	0	0	0	0	0	0
is part of EUMETNET	no	BG is a partner state	1	0	0	0	0	0	0	0	0	0	0	0	0	0	0	0	0	0	0	0	0	1
is a member state of the European Inland Fisheries and Aquaculture Advisory Commission (EIFAAC)	no		1	0	0	0	0	0	0	0	0	0	0	0	0	0	0	1	0	0	0	0	0	0
Schengen Agreement	no	IE has an opt-out, CY is committed to join	2	0	0	0	0	0	0	1	0	0	0	0	0	0	1	0	0	0	0	0	0	0
is party to the Revised European Social Charter	no		2	0	1	0	0	0	0	0	0	0	0	0	0	0	0	0	0	0	0	0	1	0
did sign the Agreement on a Unified Patent Court	yes		2	0	0	0	0	0	0	0	1	0	0	0	0	0	0	0	0	0	0	0	1	0
Istanbul Convention	no	SK, LT, BG signed but not ratified	3	0	0	0	0	0	0	0	0	0	0	0	0	0	0	0	1	0	0	1	0	1
is a member of European Molecular Biology Laboratory (EMBL)	no	BG has been a prospect member since 2024	3	0	0	0	0	0	0	0	0	0	0	0	0	1	1	0	0	0	0	0	0	1
does use the Latin script for the main language resulting in "EURO" on Euro banknotes	yes	GR, CY use Greek "ΕΥΡΩ", BG uses Cyrillic "ЕВРО"	3	0	0	0	0	0	0	0	0	0	0	0	1	0	1	0	0	0	0	0	0	1
is a member of the International Whaling Commission	no		3	0	0	0	0	0	0	0	0	0	0	0	1	0	0	1	0	0	1	0	0	0
does use an Indo-European language as the main language	no	EE, FI finno-ugric, MT semitic	3	0	0	0	0	0	0	0	0	0	0	1	0	0	0	1	0	1	0	0	0	0
right hand traffic	no		3	0	0	0	0	0	0	1	0	0	0	0	0	0	1	1	0	0	0	0	0	0
OECD	no	BG and HR are applicants	4	0	0	0	0	0	0	0	0	0	0	0	0	0	1	1	0	0	0	0	1	1
did join the RG Continental Europe of the European Network of Transmission System Operators for Electricity, managing the synchronous grid of Continental Europe (UCTE)	no		4	0	0	0	0	0	0	1	0	0	0	1	0	0	1	1	0	0	0	0	0	0
Finabel	no		4	0	0	0	0	0	0	1	0	0	1	0	0	0	0	0	0	1	0	1	0	0
NATO	no		4	0	0	0	0	0	0	1	0	0	1	0	0	0	1	1	0	0	0	0	0	0
Property regimes of international couples	?		5	0	0	0	0	0	0	1	0	0	0	0	0	0	0	0	1	1	1	1	0	0
is a member state of the International Energy Agency	no		5	0	0	0	0	0	0	0	0	0	0	0	0	1	1	1	0	0	0	0	1	1
is a member state of the Nuclear Energy Agency (NEA)	no		6	0	0	0	0	0	0	0	0	0	0	0	0	0	1	1	0	1	1	1	1	0
is part of European Centre for Medium-Range Weather Forecasts (ECMWF)	no	SK, LV, LT, BG signed a co-operation agreement, MT, CY not	6	0	0	0	0	0	0	0	0	0	0	0	0	0	1	1	1	0	1	1	0	1
does participate in the European Union Divorce Law Pact	yes		6	0	0	1	0	0	0	1	0	0	0	1	0	0	1	0	1	0	0	0	1	0
did sign the Declaration 52 on symbols of the European Union	yes		6	0	0	1	0	0	0	1	0	0	0	1	0	0	0	0	0	1	1	0	1	0
is member of the European Space Agency (ESA)	no	LV, LT, SK are associates	7	0	0	0	0	0	0	0	0	0	0	0	0	0	1	1	1	0	1	1	1	1
does have 1435 mm UIC standard gauge as the main railway track gauge if it does have operational railway	no	PT, ES use 1668 mm Iberian gauge, EE, LV, LT use 1520 mm Russian gauge, FI uses 1524 mm Russian gauge, IE uses 1600 mm; (CY, MT without operational railway)	7	0	0	0	0	0	0	1	1	1	0	1	0	0	0	0	0	1	1	1	0	0
did ratify the Oviedo Convention	no	LU, NL, IT signed	8	1	1	1	0	1	1	1	0	0	1	0	0	0	0	1	0	0	0	0	0	0
is part of European Organization for Nuclear Research (CERN)	no	CY, SL are associate states in the pre-stage to membership. HR is an associate state	8	0	1	0	0	0	0	1	0	0	0	0	0	1	1	1	0	0	1	1	1	0
did sign the Prüm Convention	yes		9	0	0	0	0	0	1	1	0	1	0	0	1	0	1	1	0	0	1	1	1	0
does use the Central European Time (CET)	no	PT, IE are in WET, the others in EET	9	0	0	0	0	0	0	1	0	1	0	1	1	0	1	0	0	1	1	1	0	1
European Sky Shield Initiative (ESSI)	no		9	0	1	0	1	0	1	1	1	1	0	0	0	0	1	1	0	0	0	0	1	0
is party to the Treaty on Conventional Armed Forces in Europe	no		10	0	0	0	0	0	0	1	0	0	1	1	0	1	1	1	0	1	1	1	1	0
is member of the International Council for the Exploration of the Sea	no		10	0	1	0	0	0	1	0	0	0	1	0	1	1	1	1	1	0	0	0	1	1
does participate in the European Southern Observatory (ESO)	no		11	0	1	0	0	0	0	0	0	0	0	0	1	1	1	1	1	1	1	1	1	1
is member of the Paris Club	no	PT is an ad hoc participant	12	0	1	0	0	0	0	0	0	1	0	0	1	1	1	1	1	1	1	1	1	1
does participate in the Institut Laue–Langevin (ILL)	no		14	1	1	1	0	0	0	1	0	1	0	1	1	0	1	1	0	1	1	1	1	1
does participate in the European Gendarmerie Force	yes	LT is an associate member	16	1	1	0	0	1	0	1	0	0	1	1	1	1	1	1	1	1	1	1	1	1
is a member state of the Eurocorps	?	AT, GR, IT are associated states	16	0	0	1	0	0	1	1	0	1	1	1	1	1	1	1	1	1	1	1	1	1
does participate in the European Maritime Force (Euromarfor or EMF)	no		17	1	1	1	0	1	0	1	0	0	1	1	1	1	1	1	1	1	1	1	1	1

== Geographic scope ==
Clickable map of Europe, showing one of the most commonly used continental boundaries
Key: blue: states which straddle the border between Europe and Asia;
green: countries not geographically in Europe, but closely associated with the continent

For the purpose of this section Europe is defined as territories of countries:

- completely inside geographic Europe
- transcontinental countries (marked blue in the map: Russia, Kazakhstan, Georgia, Azerbaijan, Turkey)
- culturally and geographically close (marked green in the map: Cyprus, Armenia)

=== Europe-centered but including countries outside Europe ===
Some agreements that are mostly related to countries of the European continent, are also valid in territories outside the continent.

Not listed below are agreements if their scope is beyond geographic Europe only because the agreement includes:

- Territories of transcontinental countries: Russia, Kazakhstan, Turkey, Cyprus, Armenia, Azerbaijan and Georgia contain some territory in Europe and some in Asia
- The EU uses bilateral Enhanced Partnership and Cooperation Agreements as an integration tool.
- Special territories of European countries, e.g. Special territories of member states of the European Union
- Cyprus, which is a member of the Council of Europe and several other agreements

List:

- NATO contains USA and Canada, but has a European focus, Article 10 of the North Atlantic Treaty describes how non-member states may join: "The Parties may [...] invite any other European State in a position to further the principles of this Treaty"
- Organization for Security and Co-operation in Europe (OSCE) contains the United States, Canada, Kyrgyzstan, Tajikistan, Turkmenistan, Uzbekistan, and Mongolia
- European Broadcasting Union (EBU) contains North African and Middle East countries
- European Olympic Committees (EOC) contains Israel

=== Limited to Europe but not to regions within it ===
- Council of Europe
- European Free Trade Association (EFTA)
- European Communities
- European Union

=== Limited to regions within geographic Europe ===
Several regional integration efforts have effectively promoted intergovernmental cooperation and reduced the possibility of regional armed conflict. Other initiatives have removed barriers to free trade in European regions, and increased the free movement of people, labour, goods, and capital across national borders.

==== Nordic countries ====
Since the end of the Second World War, the following organisations have been established in the Nordic region:

The Nordic Council and the Nordic Council of Ministers is a co-operation forum for the parliaments and governments of the Nordic countries created in February 1953. It includes the states of Denmark, Finland, Iceland, Norway and Sweden, and their autonomous territories (Greenland, Faroe Islands and Åland).

The Nordic Passport Union, created in 1954 but implemented on 1 May 1958, establishes free movement across borders without passports for the countries' citizens. It comprises Denmark, Sweden and Norway as foundational states; further, it includes Finland and Iceland since 24 September 1965, and the Danish autonomous territories of Faroe Islands since 1 January 1966.

==== Baltic Sea region ====
The following political and/or economic organisations have been in the Baltic region in the post-modern era:

The Baltic Assembly aims to promote co-operation between the parliaments of the Baltic states, namely the Republics of Estonia, Latvia and Lithuania. The organisation was planned in Vilnius on 1 December 1990, and the three nations agreed to its structure and rules on 13 June 1994.

The Baltic Free Trade Area (BAFTA) was a trade agreement between Estonia, Lithuania and Latvia. It was signed on 13 September 1993 and came into force on 1 April 1994. The agreement was later extended to apply also to agricultural products, effective from 1 January 1997. BAFTA ceased to exist when its members joined the EU on 1 May 2004.

The Council of the Baltic Sea States (CBSS) was founded in 1992 to promote intergovernmental cooperation among Baltic Sea countries in questions concerning economy, civil society development, human rights issues, and nuclear and radiation safety. It has 12 members including Denmark, Estonia, Finland, Germany, Iceland (since 1995), Latvia, Lithuania, Norway, Poland, Russia, Sweden and the European Commission.

In 2009 the European Council approved the EU Strategy for the Baltic Sea Region (EUSBSR) following a communication from the European Commission. The EUSBSR was the first macro-regional strategy in Europe. The Strategy aims to reinforce cooperation within the Baltic Sea Region, to address challenges together, and to promote balanced development in the Region. The Strategy contributes to major EU policies, including Europe 2020, and reinforces integration within the Region.

==== Low Countries region (Benelux) ====
Since the end of the First World War the following unions have been set in the Low Countries region:

The Benelux is an economic and political union between Belgium, the Netherlands, and Luxembourg. On 5 September 1944, a treaty establishing the Benelux Customs Union was signed. It entered into force in 1948, and ceased to exist on 1 November 1960, when it was replaced by the Benelux Economic Union after a treaty signed in The Hague on 3 February 1958. A Benelux Parliament was created in 1955.

The Belgium-Luxembourg Economic Union (BLEU) can be seen as a forerunner of the Benelux. BLEU was created by the treaty signed on 25 July 1921. It established a single market between both countries, while setting the Belgian franc and Luxembourgian franc at a fixed parity.

==== Black Sea region ====
Several regional organisations have been founded in the Black Sea region since the fall of the Soviet Union, such as:

The Organization of the Black Sea Economic Cooperation (BSEC) aims to ensure peace, stability and prosperity by encouraging friendly and good-neighbourly relations among the 12 state members, located mainly in the Black Sea region. It was created on 25 June 1992 in Istanbul, and entered into force on 1 May 1999. The 11 founding members were Albania, Armenia, Azerbaijan, Bulgaria, Georgia, Greece, Moldova, Romania, Russia, Turkey, and Ukraine. Serbia (then Serbia and Montenegro) joined in April 2004.

The GUAM Organization for Democracy and Economic Development is a regional organisation of four post-Soviet states, which aims to promote cooperation and democratic values, ensure stable development, enhance international and regional security, and stepping up European integration. Current members include the four founding ones, namely, Georgia, Ukraine, Azerbaijan, and Moldova. Uzbekistan joined in 1999, and left in 2005.

==== United Kingdom and Ireland ====
Since the end of the First World War, the following agreements have been signed in the United Kingdom and Ireland region:

The British–Irish Council was created by the Good Friday Agreement in 1998 to "promote the harmonious and mutually beneficial development of the totality of relationships among the peoples of these islands". It was formally established on 2 December 1999. Its membership comprises Ireland, the United Kingdom, three of the countries of the UK (Northern Ireland, Scotland and Wales), and three British Crown dependencies (Guernsey, the Isle of Man and Jersey). Because England does not have a devolved parliament, it is not represented on the council as a separate entity.

The Common Travel Area is a passport-free zone established in 1922 that comprises Ireland, the United Kingdom, the Isle of Man, Jersey and Guernsey. Under Irish law, all British citizens are exempt from immigration control and immune from deportation. They are entitled to live in Ireland without any restrictions or conditions. Under British law, Irish citizens are entitled to enter and live in the United Kingdom without any restrictions or conditions. They also have the right to vote, work, study and access welfare and healthcare services.

In January 2020, the United Kingdom left the EU, reversing most aspects of its 40+ years of participation in EU integration. Ireland continues to remain an enthusiastic member of the Union and participates in some elements of the Schengen Agreement other than the common visa policy [a position likely to remain for as a long as Northern Ireland remains part of the United Kingdom]. The Common Travel Area continues to operate though, as of June 2022, other aspects of the relationship are encountering difficulties.

==== Central Europe ====
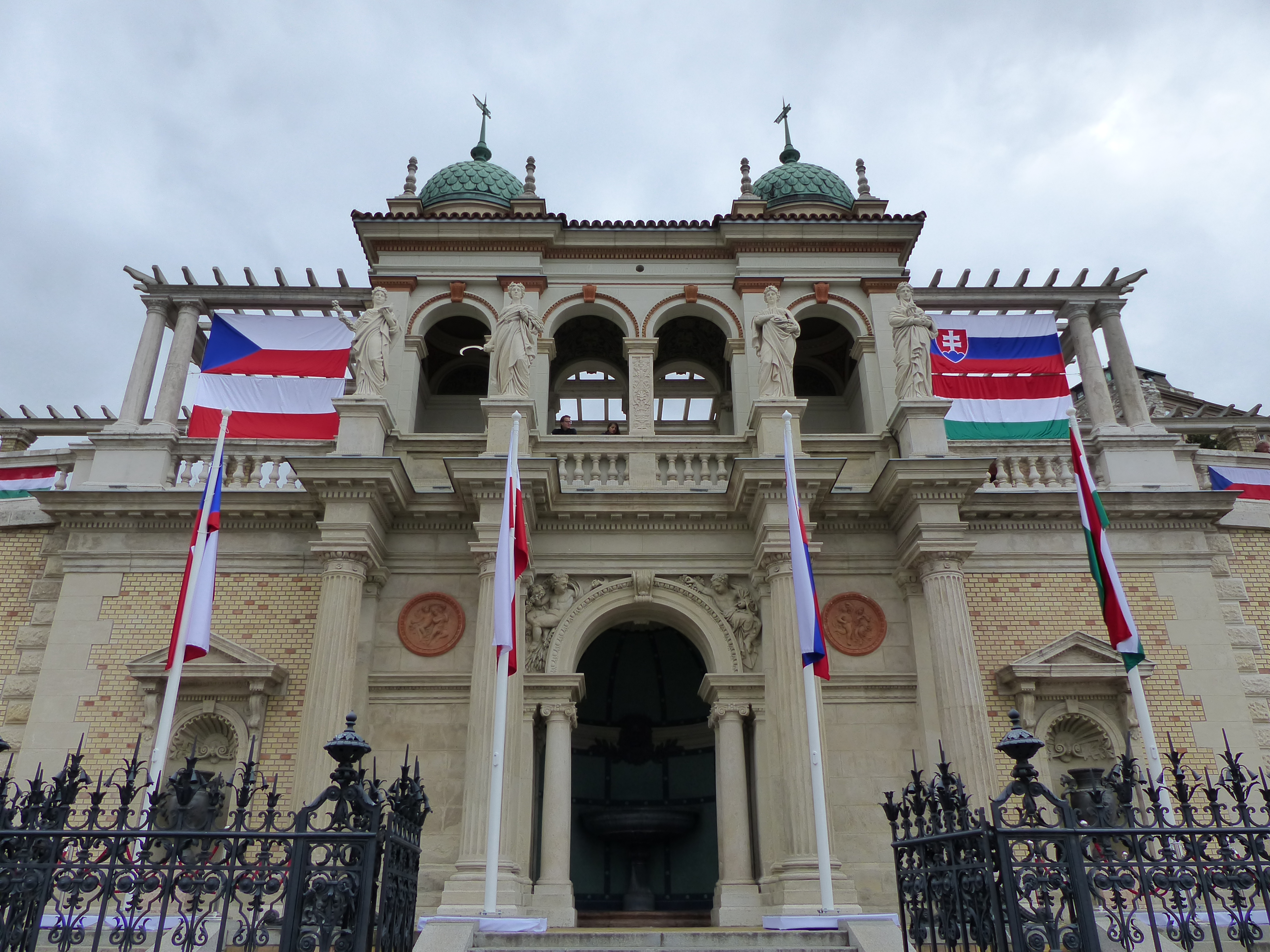
Flags of Visegrád Group countries

The following cooperation agreements have been signed in Central Europe:

The Visegrád Group is a Central-European alliance for cooperation and European integration, based on an ancient strategic alliance of core Central European countries. The Group originated in a summit meeting of Czechoslovakia, Hungary and Poland held in the Hungarian castle town of Visegrád on 15 February 1991. The Czech Republic and Slovakia became members after the dissolution of Czechoslovakia in 1993.

In 1989, the Central European Initiative, a forum of regional cooperation in Central and Eastern Europe with 18 member states, was formed in Budapest. The CEI headquarters have been in Trieste, Italy, since 1996.

The Central European Free Trade Agreement (CEFTA) is a trade agreement between countries in Central Europe and the Balkans, which works as a preparation for full European Union membership. As of 2013, it has 7 members: North Macedonia, Albania, Bosnia and Herzegovina, Moldova, Montenegro, Serbia and the UNMIK (as Kosovo).

It was established in 1992 by Czechoslovakia, Hungary and Poland, but came into force only in 1994. Czechoslovakia had in the meantime split into the Czech Republic and Slovakia. Slovenia joined in 1996, while Romania did the same in 1997, Bulgaria in 1999, and Croatia in 2003. In 2004, the Czech Republic, Slovakia, Hungary, Poland, and Slovenia left the CEFTA to join the EU. Romania and Bulgaria left it in 2007 for the same reason. Subsequently, North Macedonia joined it in 2006, (Note: Until February 2019, officially referred to by the EU and most other European organisations by the provisional appellation "the former Yugoslav Republic of Macedonia", due to a naming dispute.) and Albania, Bosnia and Herzegovina, Moldova, Montenegro, Serbia and UNMIK (on behalf of Kosovo) in 2007. In 2013, Croatia left the CEFTA to join the EU.

Switzerland and Liechtenstein participate in a customs union since 1924, and both employ the Swiss franc as national currency.

==== Eastern Europe ====
The effects of the EU integration process of the countries from the former Eastern bloc are still debated. As a result, the relationship between immigration levels and EU public support remains uncertain. Through the integration, the countries in Eastern Europe have experienced growth of the economy, benefits of the free market agreements and freedom of the labor movement within the EU. However, the results of the empirical socioeconomic analyses suggest that in Spain, France, Ireland and the Netherlands, the immigration from CEE had negative effects on support for European integration in the host societies. The research also implies that the immigration from the CEE seems to undermine the long-term effects of the integration. There are theories for the programs of social development that range in views from: an extended contact with the immigrants from Eastern Europe might help forge a common European identity and it could also lead to a potential national isolation, caused by tightening support mechanisms for the labor immigration. Equal amount of research also implies that the internal migration of the countries within the EU is necessary for the successful development of its economic union.

==== Danube region ====
The EU Strategy for the Danube Region was endorsed by the European Council in 2011 and is the second macro-regional strategy in Europe. The Strategy provides a basis for improved cooperation among 14 countries along the Danube River. It aims to improve the effectiveness of regional integration efforts and leverage the impact of policies at the EU, national and local levels.

==== Balkans ====
The Craiova Group, Craiova Four, or C4 is a cooperation project of four European states – Romania, Bulgaria, Greece and Serbia – for the purposes of furthering their European integration as well as economic, transport and energy cooperation with one another.

== Council of Europe ==
Blue: Council of Europe member states Light-grey: Non-member states

Against the background of the devastation and human suffering during the Second World War as well as the need for reconciliation after the war, the idea of European integration led to the creation of the Council of Europe in Strasbourg in 1949.

The most important achievement of the Council of Europe is the European Convention on Human Rights of 1950 with its European Court of Human Rights in Strasbourg, which serves as a de facto supreme court for human rights and fundamental freedoms throughout Europe. Human rights are also protected by the Council of Europe's Committee for the Prevention of Torture and the European Social Charter.

Istanbul Convention

Most conventions of the Council of Europe pursue the aim of greater legal integration, such as the conventions on legal assistance, against corruption, against money laundering, against doping in sport, or internet crime.

Cultural co-operation is based on the Cultural Convention of 1954 and subsequent conventions on the recognition of university studies and diplomas as well as on the protection of minority languages.

After the fall of the Berlin Wall, former communist European countries were able to accede to the Council of Europe, which now comprises 46 states in Europe. Therefore, European integration has practically succeeded at the level of the Council of Europe, encompassing almost the whole European continent, with the exception of Belarus, Kazakhstan, Kosovo, Russia, and the Vatican City.

European integration at the level of the Council of Europe functions through the accession of member states to its conventions, and through political coordination at the level of ministerial conferences and inter-parliamentary sessions. In accordance with its Statute of 1949, the Council of Europe works to achieve greater unity among its members based on common values, such as human rights and democracy.

== European Political Community ==
European Political Community member states

The European Political Community (EPC) is an intergovernmental forum for political and strategic discussions about the future of Europe. The inaugural summit was held on 6 October 2022 in Prague, with participants from 44 European countries, as well as the Presidents of the European Council and the European Commission.

== Organization for Security and Co-operation in Europe ==
OSCE, orthographic projection

The Organization for Security and Co-operation in Europe (OSCE) is a trans-Atlantic intergovernmental organisation whose aim is to secure stability in Europe. It was established as the Conference on Security and Co-operation in Europe (CSCE) in July 1973, and was subsequently transformed into its current form in January 1995. The OSCE has 56 member states, covering most of the Northern Hemisphere.

The OSCE develops three lines of activities, namely the Politico-Military Dimension, the Economic and Environmental Dimension and the Human Dimension. These respectively promote (i) mechanisms for conflict prevention and resolution; (ii) the monitoring, alerting and assistance in case of economic and environmental threats; and (iii) full respect for human rights and fundamental freedoms.

Organization for Security and Co-operation in Europe

== European Free Trade Association ==
EFTA members

The European Free Trade Association (EFTA) is a European trade bloc which was established on 3 May 1960 as an alternative for European states who did not join the EEC. EFTA currently has four member states: Iceland, Norway, Switzerland, and Liechtenstein; just Norway and Switzerland are founding members.

The EFTA Convention was signed on 4 January 1960 in Stockholm by seven states: Austria, Denmark, Norway, Portugal, Sweden, Switzerland and the United Kingdom. Finland became an associate member in 1961 and a full member in 1986; Iceland joined in 1970 and Liechtenstein did the same in 1991. A revised Convention, the Vaduz Convention, was signed on 21 June 2001 and entered into force on 1 June 2002.

The United Kingdom and Denmark left in 1973, when they joined the European Community (EC). Portugal left EFTA in 1986, when it also joined the EC. Austria, Finland and Sweden ceased to be EFTA members in 1995 by joining the European Union, which superseded the EC in 1993.

== European Broadcasting Union ==
Countries with Active EBU Membership coloured in order of accession from 1950

The European Broadcasting Union (EBU) is an alliance of public service media entities, established on 12 February 1950. As of 2022, the organisation comprises 112 active members in 54 countries, and 30 associate members from a further 19 countries. Most EU states are part of this organisation, and therefore the EBU has been subject to supranational legislation and regulation. It also hosted debates between candidates for the European Commission presidency for the 2014 parliamentary elections, but is unrelated to the EU itself.

== European Patent Convention ==
EPC contracting states and the extension state Bosnia and Herzegovina

The European Patent Convention (EPC), also known as the Convention on the Grant of European Patents of 5 October 1973, is a multilateral treaty instituting the European Patent Organisation and providing an autonomous legal system according to which European patents are granted. As of 2022, there are 39 parties to the European Patent Convention. The Convention on the Grant of European Patents was first signed on 5 October 1973.

== European Communities ==
In 1951, Belgium, France, Italy, Luxembourg, the Netherlands and West Germany agreed to confer powers over their steel and coal production to the European Coal and Steel Community (ECSC) in the Treaty of Paris, which came into force on 23 July 1952.

Coal and steel production was essential for the reconstruction of countries in Europe after the Second World War and this sector of the national economy had been important for warfare in the First and Second World Wars. Therefore, France had originally maintained its occupation of the Saarland with its steel companies after the founding of the Federal Republic of Germany (West Germany) in 1949. By transferring national powers over the coal and steel production to a newly created ECSC Commission, the member states of the ECSC were able to provide for greater transparency and trust among themselves.

This transfer of national powers to a "Community" to be exercised by its commission was paralleled under the 1957 Treaty of Rome establishing the European Atomic Energy Community (or Euratom) and the European Economic Community (EEC) in Brussels.

In 1967, the Merger Treaty (or Brussels Treaty) combine the institutions of the ECSC and Euratom into that of the EEC. They already shared a Parliamentary Assembly and Courts. Collectively they were known as the European Communities. In 1987, the Single European Act (SEA) was the first major revision of the Treaty of Rome that formally established the single European market and the European Political Cooperation. The Communities originally had independent personalities although they were increasingly integrated, and over the years were transformed into what is now called the European Union.

The six states that founded the three Communities were known as the "inner six" (the "outer seven" were those countries who formed the European Free Trade Association). These were Belgium, France, Italy, Luxembourg, the Netherlands, and West Germany. The first enlargement was in 1973, with the accession of Denmark, Ireland and the United Kingdom. Greece joined in 1981, and Portugal and Spain in 1986. On 3 October 1990 East Germany and West Germany were reunified, hence East Germany became part of the Community in the new reunified Germany (not increasing the number of states).

A key person in the Community creation process was Jean Monnet, regarded as the "founding father" of the European Union, which is seen as the dominant force in European integration.

== European Union ==
European Single Market integration: European Union member states form the European Single Market Non-EU states that participate in the EU Single Market with exceptions: Iceland, Liechtenstein, Norway and Switzerland (see also EFTA) Part of a former EU state that remains partially aligned to the EU Single Market on goods: Northern Ireland in the United Kingdom (see also Brexit and the Irish border) Non-EU states with a Stabilisation and Association Agreement with the EU allowing for participation in selected sectors of the Single Market: EU accession candidates Albania, Bosnia and Herzegovina, Montenegro, North Macedonia and Serbia; EU accession potential candidate Kosovo Non-EU states with a Deep and Comprehensive Free Trade Area agreement with the EU allowing for participation in selected sectors of the Single Market: Georgia, Moldova and Ukraine Non-EU states which have a bilateral Customs Union arrangement with the EU: Turkey (an accession candidate), Andorra and San Marino

The European Union (EU) is an association of 27 sovereign member states, that by treaty have delegated certain of their competences to common institutions, in order to coordinate their policies in a number of areas, without however constituting a new state on top of the member states. Officially established by the Treaty of Maastricht in 1993 upon the foundations of the pre-existing European Economic Community.

Thus, 12 states are founding members, namely, Belgium, Denmark, France, Germany, Greece, Ireland, Italy, Luxembourg, the Netherlands, Portugal, Spain, and the United Kingdom. In 1995, Austria, Finland and Sweden entered the EU. Cyprus, the Czech Republic, Estonia, Hungary, Latvia, Lithuania, Malta, Poland, Slovakia, and Slovenia joined in 2004. Bulgaria and Romania joined in 2007. Croatia acceded in 2013. The United Kingdom withdrew in 2020 after 47 years of membership. Official candidate states include Albania, Bosnia and Herzegovina, Georgia, North Macedonia, Moldova, Montenegro, Serbia, Turkey and Ukraine. Morocco's application was rejected by the EEC. Iceland and Switzerland have withdrawn their respective applications. Norway rejected membership in two referendums. The membership negotiations process between the EU and Turkey, which started on 3 October 2005, has been suspended since 2019.

The institutions of the European Union, its parliamentarians, judges, commissioners and secretariat, the governments of its member states as well as their people, all play a role in European Integration. Nevertheless, the question of who plays the key role is disputed as there are different theories on European Integration focusing on different actors and agency.

The European Union has a number of relationships with nations that are not formally part of the Union. According to the European Union's official site, and a statement by Commissioner Günter Verheugen, the aim is to have a ring of countries, sharing EU's democratic ideals and joining them in further integration without necessarily becoming full member states.

=== Competences ===
Whilst most responsibilities ('competences') are retained by the member states, some competences are conferred exclusively on the Union for collective decision, some are shared pending Union action and some receive Union support. These are shown on this table:

Competences of the European Union in relation to those of its member states

Exclusive competence

Shared competence

Supporting competence

The Union has exclusive competence to make directives and conclude international agreements when provided for in a Union legislative act as to …
- the customs union
- the establishing of the competition rules necessary for the functioning of the internal market
- monetary policy for the Member States whose currency is the euro
- the conservation of marine biological resources under the common fisheries policy
- Common Commercial Policy
- conclusion of certain international agreements

Member States cannot exercise competence in areas where the Union has done so, that is …
- the internal market
- social policy, for the aspects defined in TFEU
- economic, social and territorial cohesion
- agriculture and fisheries, excluding the conservation of marine biological resources
- environment
- consumer protection
- transport
- trans-European networks
- energy
- the area of freedom, security and justice
- common safety concerns in public health matters, for the aspects defined in TFEU

Union exercise of competence shall not result in Member States being prevented from exercising theirs in …
- research, technological development and (outer) space
- development cooperation, humanitarian aid

The Union coordinates Member States policies or implements supplemental to their common policies not covered elsewhere in …
- the coordination of economic, employment and social policies
- common foreign, security and defence policies

The Union can carry out actions to support, coordinate or supplement Member States' actions in …
- the protection and improvement of human health
- industry
- culture
- tourism
- education, youth, sport and vocational training
- civil protection (disaster prevention)
- administrative cooperation

=== Economic integration ===
The European Union operates a single economic market across the territory of all its members, and uses a single currency between the Eurozone members. Further, the EU has a number of economic relationships with nations that are not formally part of the Union through the European Economic Area and customs union agreements.

==== Free trade area ====
EU free trade agreements European Union Agreement in force Agreement (in part) provisionally applied

The creation of the EEC eliminated tariffs, quotas and preferences on goods among member states, which are the requisites to define a free trade area (FTA). The United Kingdom remains part of the FTA during the transition period of the Brexit withdrawal agreement.

Numerous countries have signed a European Union Association Agreement (AA) with FTA provisions. These mainly include Mediterranean countries (Algeria in 2005, Egypt in 2004, Israel in 2000, Jordan in 2002, Lebanon in 2006, Morocco in 2000, Palestinian National Authority in 1997, and Tunisia in 1998), albeit some countries from other trade blocs have also signed one (such as Chile in 2003, Mexico in 2000, and South Africa in 2000).

Further, many Balkan states have signed a Stabilisation and Association Agreement (SAA) with FTA provisions, such as Albania (signed 2006), Montenegro (2007), North Macedonia (2004), Bosnia and Herzegovina and Serbia (both 2008, entry-into-force pending).

In 2008, Poland and Sweden proposed the Eastern Partnership which would include setting a FTA between the EU and Armenia, Azerbaijan, Belarus, Georgia, Moldova and Ukraine.

==== Customs union ====
The European Union Customs Union defines an area where no customs are levied on goods travelling within it. It includes all member states of the European Union. The abolition of internal tariff barriers between EEC member states was achieved in 1968.

Andorra and San Marino belong to the EU customs unions with third states. Turkey is linked by the European Union–Turkey Customs Union.

==== European Single Market ====
A prominent goal of the EU since its creation by the Maastricht Treaty in 1992 is establishing and maintaining a single market. This seeks to guarantee the four basic freedoms, which are related to ensure the free movement of goods, services, capital and people around the EU's internal market.

The United Kingdom remained part of the single market during the transition period of the Brexit withdrawal agreement. The European Economic Area (EEA) agreement allows Norway, Iceland and Liechtenstein to participate in the European Single Market without joining the EU. The four basic freedoms apply. However, some restrictions on fisheries and agriculture take place. Switzerland is linked to the European Union by Swiss-EU bilateral agreements, with a different content from that of the EEA agreement.

==== Eurozone ====
Economic and Monetary Union of the European Union Members of the Eurozone ERM-II member with opt-out (Denmark) The rest of the EU-members, which are obliged to join

The Eurozone refers to the European Union member states that have adopted the euro currency union as the third stage of the European Economic and Monetary Union (EMU). Further, certain states outside the EU have adopted the euro as their currency, despite not belonging to the EMU. Thus, a total of 27 states, including 21 European Union states and six non-EU members, currently use the euro.

The Eurozone came into existence with the official launch of the euro on 1 January 1999. Physical coins and banknotes were introduced on 1 January 2002.

The original members were Austria, Belgium, Finland, France, Germany, Ireland, Italy, Luxembourg, the Netherlands, Portugal, and Spain. Greece adopted the euro on 1 January 2001. Slovenia joined on 1 January 2007, Cyprus and Malta were admitted on 1 January 2008, Slovakia joined on 1 January 2009, Estonia on 1 January 2011, Latvia on 1 January 2014, Lithuania on 1 January 2015, Croatia on 1 January 2023, and Bulgaria on 1 January 2026.

Outside the EU, agreements have been concluded with Andorra, Monaco, San Marino, and Vatican City for formal adoption, including the right to issue their own coins. Montenegro and Kosovo} unilaterally adopted the euro when it launched.

==== Fiscal union ====
There has long been speculation about the possibility of the European Union eventually becoming a fiscal union. In the wake of the European debt crisis that began in 2009, calls for closer fiscal ties, possibly leading to some sort of fiscal union have increased; though it is generally regarded as implausible in the short term, some analysts regard fiscal union as a long-term necessity. While stressing the need for coordination, governments have rejected talk of fiscal union or harmonisation in this regard.

==== Aviation ====
ECAC, Eurocontrol, ECAA, EU ECAC, Eurocontrol, ECAA ECAC, Eurocontrol ECAC, ECAA ECAC

There are three main aviation related institutions present in Europe:

- European Civil Aviation Conference (ECAC)
- Eurocontrol
- European Common Aviation Area (ECAA)

==== Energy ====
Energy Community in 2023 – Contracting Parties in blue and purple, Observers in yellow

The transnational energy related structures present in Europe are:

- Energy Community
- European Atomic Energy Community
- European Network of Transmission System Operators for Electricity
- European Network of Transmission System Operators for Gas
- INOGATE
- Energy Charter Treaty

==== Standardisation ====
The transnational standardisation organisations present in Europe are:

- European Telecommunications Standards Institute (ETSI)
- European Committee for Standardization (CEN)
- European Committee for Electrotechnical Standardization (CENELEC)
- Institute for Reference Materials and Measurements (IRMM)

=== Social and political integration ===
==== Education ====
The ERASMUS programme (European Region Action Scheme for the Mobility of University Students) seeks to encourage and support free movement of the academic community. It was established in 1987.

A total of 33 states (including all European Union states, Iceland, Liechtenstein, Norway, Switzerland and Turkey) are involved.

European Higher Education Area

The European Higher Education Area (EHEA) aims to integrate education systems in Europe. Thus, degrees and study periods are recognised mutually. This is done by following the Bologna process, and under the Lisbon Recognition Convention of the Council of Europe.

The Bologna declaration was signed in 1999 by 29 countries, all EU members or candidates at the moment (except Cyprus which joined later) and three out of four EFTA countries: Austria, Belgium, Bulgaria, Czech Republic, Denmark, Estonia, Finland, France, Germany, Greece, Hungary, Iceland, Ireland, Italy, Latvia, Lithuania, Luxembourg, Malta, the Netherlands, Norway, Poland, Portugal, Romania, Slovakia, Slovenia, Spain, Sweden, Switzerland, and United Kingdom. Croatia, Cyprus, Liechtenstein, and Turkey joined in 2001. In 2003, Albania, Andorra, Bosnia and Herzegovina, the Holy See (a Council of Europe permanent observer), North Macedonia, Russia, and Serbia signed the convention. Armenia, Azerbaijan, Georgia, Moldova and Ukraine followed in 2005. Montenegro joined in 2007. Finally, Kazakhstan (not a member of the Council of Europe) joined in 2010. This makes a total of 47 member states. Monaco and San Marino are the only members of the Council of Europe which have not adopted the convention. The other European nation that is eligible to join, but has not, is Belarus.

==== Research ====
There are a number of multinational research institutions based in Europe.

- In the EIROforum collaboration:
  - European Space Agency
  - European Molecular Biology Laboratory
  - European Fusion Development Agreement
  - European Southern Observatory
  - Particle physics:
    - CERN
    - European Synchrotron Radiation Facility
    - Institut Laue–Langevin
    - European XFEL
- Meteorology:
  - EUMETSAT
  - European Centre for Medium-Range Weather Forecasts
  - EUMETNET

==== Health ====
EHIC participating nations (EU members in blue, non-members in green)

epSOS participating nations

The European Health Insurance Card (or EHIC) is issued free of charge and allows anyone who is insured by or covered by a statutory social security scheme of the EEA countries and Switzerland to receive medical treatment in another member state for free or at a reduced cost, if that treatment becomes necessary during their visit (for example, due to illness or an accident), or if they have a chronic pre-existing condition which requires care such as kidney dialysis.

The epSOS project, also known as Smart Open Services for European Patients, aims to promote free movement of patients. It will allow health professionals to electronically access the data from patients from another country, to electronically process prescriptions in all involved countries, or to provide treatment in another EU state to a patient on a waiting list.

The project has been launched by the EU and 47 member institutions from 23 EU member states and 3 non-EU members. They include national health ministries, national competence centres, social insurance institutions and scientific institutions as well as technical and administrative management entities.

==== Charter of Fundamental Rights ====
The Charter of Fundamental Rights of the European Union is a document enshrining certain fundamental rights. The wording of the document has been agreed at ministerial level and has been incorporated into the Treaty of Lisbon. Poland has negotiated an opt out from this Charter, as had the United Kingdom before the latter's withdrawal from the European Union.

==== Right to vote ====
The European integration process has extended the right of foreigners to vote. Thus, European Union citizens were given voting rights in local elections by the 1992 Maastricht Treaty. Several member states (Belgium, Luxembourg, Lithuania, and Slovenia) have extended since then the right to vote to all foreign residents. This was already the case in Denmark, Finland, the Netherlands and Sweden. Further, voting and eligibility rights are granted among citizens of the Nordic Passport Union, and between numerous countries through bilateral treaties (i.e. between Norway and Spain, or between Portugal and Brazil, Cape Verde, Iceland, Norway, Uruguay, Venezuela, Chile and Argentina), or without them (i.e. Ireland and the United Kingdom). Finally, within the EEA, Iceland and Norway also grant the right to vote to all foreign residents.

==== Schengen Area ====
Members of the Schengen Agreement Future members (Cyprus) Cooperating countries (Ireland)

The main purpose of the establishment of the Schengen Agreement is the abolition of physical borders among European countries. A total of 30 states, including 26 European Union states (all except Ireland, which is part of the Common Travel Area with the United Kingdom) and four non-EU members (Iceland, Liechtenstein, Norway, and Switzerland), are subject to the Schengen rules. Its provisions have already been implemented by 29 states, leaving just Cyprus to do so among signatory states.

Further, Monaco, San Marino and Vatican City are de facto members.

==== Visa policy in EU ====
European Union has visa-free regime agreements with some European countries outside EU and discussing such agreements with others; Armenia, Russia, Ukraine, and Moldova. Matters concerning Turkey have also been debated. Ireland maintains an independent visa policy in the EU.

=== Defence ===
NATO members in blue, CSTO members in orange

There are a number of multi-national military and peacekeeping forces which are ultimately under the command of the EU, and therefore can be seen as the core for a future European Union army. These corps include forces from 26 EU states (all except Malta, which currently does not participate in any battlegroup), Norway and Turkey. Denmark used to have an opt-out clause in its accession treaty and was not obliged to participate in the common defence policy, but in 2022 decided to abandon its stance. Further, the Western European Union (WEU) capabilities and functions have been transferred to the European Union, under its developing Common Foreign and Security Policy (CFSP) and European Security and Defence Policy (ESDP).

The EU also has close ties with the North Atlantic Treaty Organization (NATO), according to the Berlin Plus agreement. This is a comprehensive package of agreements made between NATO and the EU on 16 December 2002. With this agreement the EU is given the possibility to use NATO assets in case it wanted to act independently in an international crisis, on the condition that NATO does not want to act itself – the so-called "right of first refusal".

The participation in European defence organisations

In fact, many EU member states are among the 32 NATO members. The Treaty of Brussels is considered the precursor to NATO. The North Atlantic Treaty was signed in Washington, D.C., in 1949. It included the five Treaty of Brussels states, as well as the United States, Canada, Portugal, Italy, Norway, Denmark and Iceland. Greece and Turkey joined the alliance in 1952, and West Germany did the same in 1955. Spain entered in 1982. In 1999, Hungary, the Czech Republic, and Poland became NATO members. Finally, Bulgaria, Estonia, Latvia, Lithuania, Romania, Slovenia, and Slovakia joined in 2004. In 2009, Albania and Croatia joined. In 2008, Ukraine and Georgia were told that they will also eventually become members. Montenegro and North Macedonia joined in 2017 and 2020 respectively. In 2023 and 2024, Finland and Sweden joined. Thus, 23 out of 32 NATO states are among the 27 EU members, another two are members of the EEA, and one more is an EU candidate and also a member of the European Union Customs Union.

=== Space ===
ESA member countries
ECS states
signed Cooperation Agreement (CA)

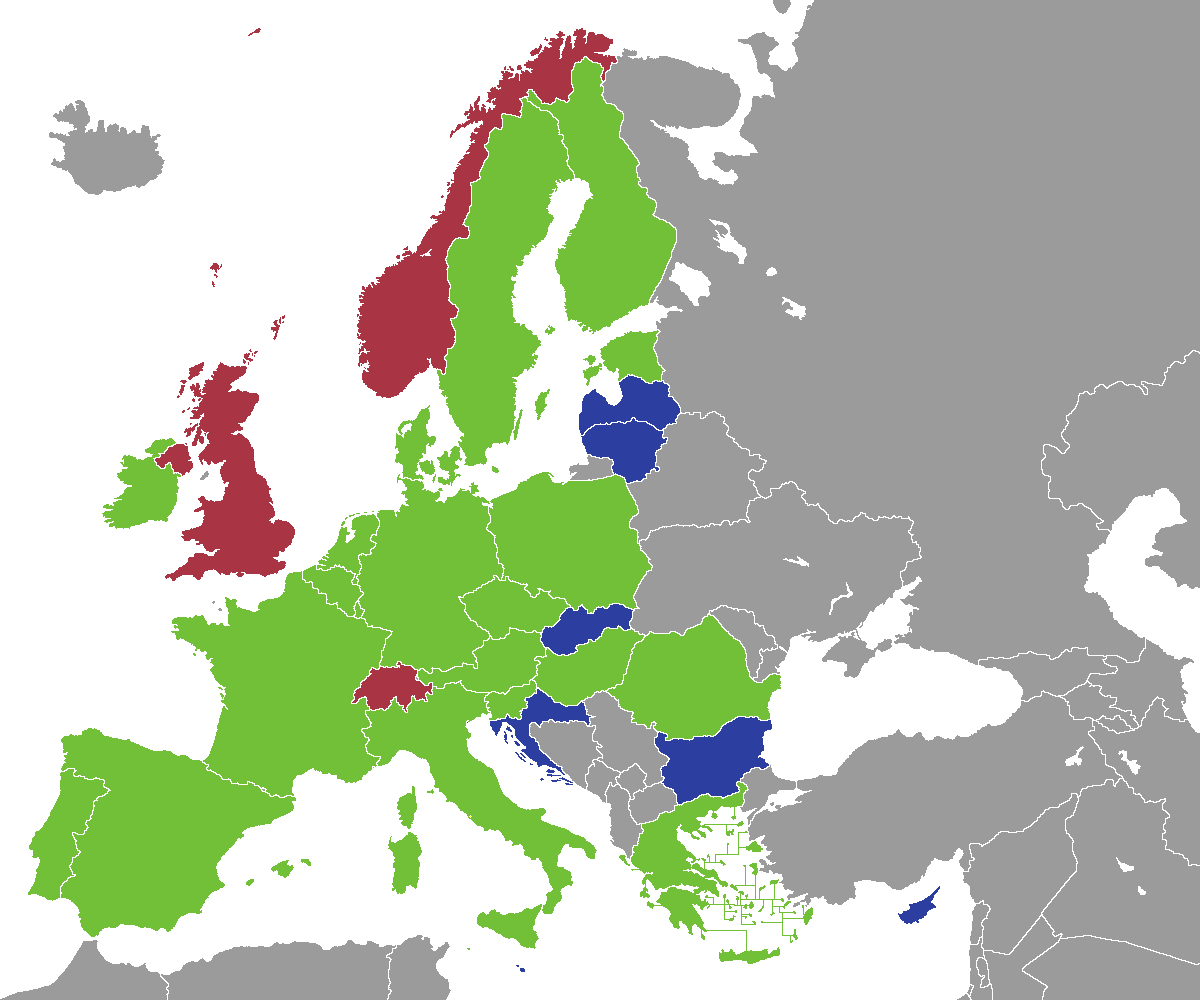
ESA and EU member countries
ESA-only members
EU-only members

On 22 May 2007, the member states of the European Union have agreed to create a common political framework for space activities in Europe by unifying the approach of the European Space Agency (ESA) with those of the individual European Union member states.

However, ESA is an intergovernmental organisation with no formal organic link to the EU; indeed the two institutions have different member states and are governed by different rules and procedures. ESA was created in 1975 by the merger of the two pre-existing European organisations engaged in space activities, ELDO and ESRO. The 10 founding members were Belgium, Denmark, France, Germany, Italy, the Netherlands, Spain, Sweden, Switzerland and the United Kingdom. Ireland joined on 31 December 1975. In 1987, Austria and Norway became member states. Finland joined in 1995, Portugal in 2000, Greece and Luxembourg in 2005, the Czech Republic in 2008, and Romania in 2011. Currently, it has 20 member states: all the EU member states before 2004, plus Czech Republic, Norway, Poland, Romania, and Switzerland. In addition, Canada has had the special status of a Cooperating State under a series of cooperation agreements dating since 1979.

In 2007 the political perspective of the European Union was to make ESA an agency of the EU by 2014. ESA is likely to expand in the coming years with the countries which joined the EU in both 2004 and 2007. Currently, almost all EU member states are in different stages of affiliation with ESA. Poland has joined on 19 November 2012. Hungary and Estonia have signed ESA Convention. Latvia and Slovenia have started to implement a Plan for European Cooperating State (PECS) Charter. Slovakia, Lithuania and Bulgaria have signed a European Cooperating State (ECS) Agreement. Cyprus, Malta and Croatia have signed Cooperation Agreements with ESA.

== Future of European integration ==
De jure status of possible future enlargement of the European Union: Current member states Former member state which has withdrawn from the EU: United Kingdom Candidates: Albania, Bosnia and Herzegovina, Georgia, North Macedonia, Moldova, Montenegro, Serbia, Turkey and Ukraine Potential candidates that have applied for membership: Kosovo* (status disputed). States that have withdrawn their applications: Iceland, Norway, Switzerland

There is no fixed end to the process of integration. The discussion on the possible final political shape or configuration of the European Union is sometimes referred to as the debate on the finalité politique (French for "political purpose"). Integration and enlargement of the European Union are major issues in the politics of Europe, each at European, national and local level. Integration may conflict with national sovereignty and cultural identity, and is opposed by eurosceptics. To the east of the European Union, the countries of Belarus, Kazakhstan and Russia launched the creation of the Eurasian Economic Union in the year 2015, which was subsequently joined by Armenia and Kyrgyzstan. Other states in the region, such as Moldova and Tajikistan may also join. Meanwhile, the post-Soviet disputed states of Abkhazia, Artsakh, South Ossetia, and Transnistria have created the Community for Democracy and Rights of Nations to closer integrate among each other. Some Eastern European countries such as Armenia have opted to cooperate with both the EU and the Eurasian Union. On 24 February 2017 Tigran Sargsyan, the Chairman of the Eurasian Economic Commission stated that Armenia's stance was to cooperate and work with both the European Union and the Eurasian Economic Union. Sargsyan added that although Armenia is part of the Eurasian Union, a new European Union Association Agreement between Armenia and the EU would be finalized shortly.

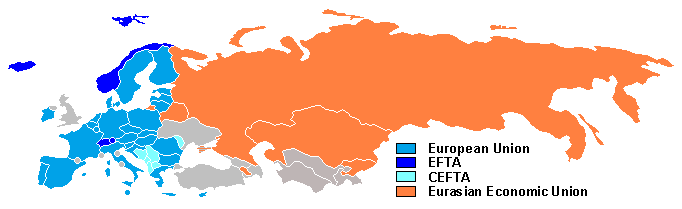
Economical integration blocs

Several countries in Eastern Europe have engaged the EU with the aim to grow economic and political ties. The Euronest Parliamentary Assembly, established in 2003, is the inter-parliamentary forum in which members of the European Parliament and the national parliaments of Ukraine, Moldova, Belarus, Armenia, Azerbaijan and Georgia participate and forge closer political and economic ties with the European Union. All of these States participate in the EU's Eastern Partnership program. The Organization of the Black Sea Economic Cooperation and the Community of Democratic Choice are other organizations established to promote European integration, stability, and democracy. On 12 January 2002, the European Parliament noted that Armenia and Georgia may enter the EU in the future. On 2 March 2024, Armenian Prime Minister Nikol Pashinyan advised that Armenia would officially "apply to become a candidate for EU membership in the coming days, within a month at most". On 5 March, Pashinyan stated that Armenia would apply for EU candidacy by autumn 2024 at the latest. On 12 March 2024, the European Parliament passed a resolution confirming Armenia meets Maastricht Treaty Article 49 requirements and may apply for EU membership. The National Assembly of Armenia approved the matter in January 2025 to start the accession of Armenia to the European Union and the matter will be put to a referendum for confirmation or rejection by the Armenian people. On 9 January 2025, the Armenian government approved the bill to launch a bid for the country to join the European Union. Currently, Georgia is the only country in the Caucasus actively seeking EU membership.

=== European Security Treaty ===
In 2008, Russian President Dmitry Medvedev announced a new concept for Russian foreign politics and called for the creation of a common space in Euro-Atlantic and Eurasia area "from Vancouver to Vladivostok". On 5 June 2009 in Berlin he proposed a new all-European pact for security that would include all European, CIS countries and the United States. On 29 November 2009 a draft version of the European Security Treaty appeared. French president Sarkozy spoke positively about Medvedev's ideas and called for closer security and economic relation between Europe and Russia.

=== Common space from Lisbon to Vladivostok ===
Area from Lisbon to Vladivostok with all European and CIS countries

Russian Prime Minister Vladimir Putin in a German newspaper in 2010 called for common economic space, free-trade area or more advanced economic integration, stretching from Lisbon to Vladivostok. He also said it is quite possible Russia could join the eurozone one day. French president Nicolas Sarkozy in 2010 said he believed in 10 or 15 years there will be common economic space between EU and Russia with visa-free regime and general concept of security.

Instead Russia has chosen economic policy of self-sufficiency and economic autarky. Russia has been unable to compete with the EU economy, so integration might be at the cost of its own political and socio-economic stability.

=== Concept of a single legal space for the CIS and Europe ===
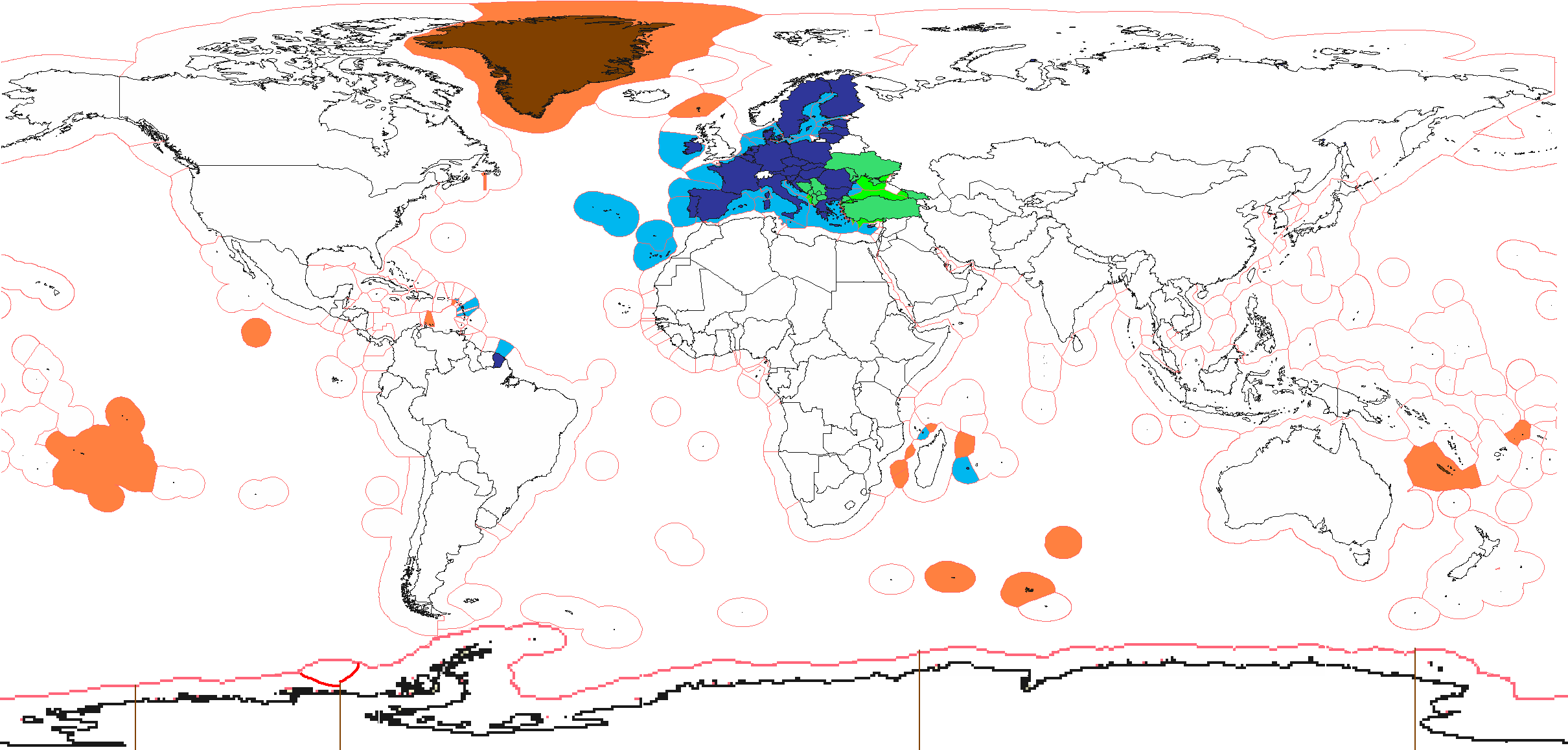
Member states of the European Union Current enlargement agenda Special member state territories outside the EU EEZ of special member state territories outside the EU

Russian legal scholar Oleg Kutafin and economist Alexander Zakharov produced a Concept of a Single Legal Space for the CIS and Europe in 2002. This idea was fully incorporated in the resolution of the 2003 Moscow Legal Forum. The Forum gathered representatives of more than 20 countries including 10 CIS countries. In 2007 both the International Union of Jurists of the CIS and the International Union (Commonwealth) of Advocates passed resolutions that strongly support the Concept of a Single Legal Space for Europe and post-Soviet Countries.

The concept said: "Obviously, to improve its legislation Russia and other countries of CIS should be oriented toward the continental legal family of European law. The civil law system is much closer to the Russian and other CIS countries will be instrumental in harmonising legislation of CIS countries and the European Community but all values of common law should be also investigated on the subject of possible implementation in some laws and norms. It is suggested that the introduction of the concept of a Single legal space and a single Rule of Law space for Europe and CIS be implemented in four steps:

1. Development plans at the national level regarding adoption of selected EC legal standards in the legislation of CIS countries;
2. Promotion of measures for harmonisation of law with the goal of developing a single legal space for Europe and CIS countries in the area of commercial and corporate law;
3. Making the harmonisation of judicial practice of CIS countries compatible with Rule of Law principles and coordination of the basic requirements of the Rule of Law in CIS countries with the EU legal standards.
4. Development of ideas the Roerich Pact (International Treaty on the Protection of Artistic and Scientific Institution and Historic Monuments initiated by Russian thinker Nicholas Roerich and signed in 1935 by 40 % of sovereign states in Washington D.C.) into the law of CIS countries and European law.

== Beyond Europe ==
=== Euro-Mediterranean Partnership ===
EU regional initiatives; current enlargement agenda (SAP and candidate countries), ENP; Eastern Partnership, Euromediterranean Partnership and EU-Russia Common Spaces

The Euro-Mediterranean Partnership or Barcelona Process was organised by the European Union to strengthen its relations with the countries in the Mashriq and Maghreb regions. It started in 1995 with the Barcelona Euro-Mediterranean Conference, and it has been developed in successive annual meetings.

The European Union enlargement of 2004 brought two more Mediterranean countries (Cyprus and Malta) into the Union, while adding a total of 10 to the number of Member States. The Euro-Mediterranean Partnership today comprises 43 members: 27 European Union member states, and 15 partner countries (Albania, Algeria, Bosnia and Herzegovina, Egypt, Israel, Jordan, Lebanon, Libya, Mauritania, Monaco, Montenegro, Morocco, Syria and Tunisia, as well as the Palestinian Territories). Libya has had observer status since 1999.

The Euro-Mediterranean Free Trade Area (EU-MEFTA) is based on the Barcelona Process and European Neighbourhood Policy (ENP). It will cover the EU, the EFTA, the EU customs unions with third states (Andorra, San Marino, and Turkey), the EU candidate states, and the partners of the Barcelona Process.

The Union for the Mediterranean is a community of countries, mostly bordering the Mediterranean Sea, established in July 2008.

==== Ties with partners ====
Morocco already has a number of close ties with the EU, including an Association Agreement with FTA provisions, air transport integration, or the participation in military operations such as ALTHEA in Bosnia.

Further, it will be the first partner to go beyond association by enhancing political and economic ties, entering the Single Market, and participating in some EU agencies.

=== Commonwealth of Independent States ===
European Union and Commonwealth of Independent States

The Commonwealth of Independent States (CIS) is a loose organisation in which most former Soviet republics participate. A visa-free regime operates among members and a free-trade area is planned. Ukraine is not an official member, but has participated in the organisation. Some members are more integrated than others, for example Russia and Belarus form a Union State. In 2010, Belarus, Russia and Kazakhstan formed a customs union and a single market (Common Economic Space) commenced on 1 January 2012. The Presidents of Belarus, Russia and Kazakhstan established the Eurasian Economic Union with a Eurasian Commission in 2015, subsequently joined by Armenia and Kyrgyzstan. A common currency is also planned, potentially to be named "evraz". Some other countries in the region, such as Moldova are potential members of these organisations.

=== Community for Democracy and Rights of Nations ===
The post-Soviet disputed states of Abkhazia, South Ossetia, and Transnistria are all members of the Community for Democracy and Rights of Nations which aims to forge closer integration.

=== EU and other regions and countries in the world ===
ASEM

ACP countries

EuroLat

Proposed TAFTA

The European Union cooperates with some other countries and regions via loose organisations and regular meetings. The ASEM forum, consisting of the EU and some Asian countries, has been held every two years since 1996. The EU and African, Caribbean and Pacific Group of States form the ACP–EU Joint Parliamentary Assembly, promoting ACP–EU development cooperation, democracy and human rights. The EU and Latin American countries form the Euro-Latin American Parliamentary Assembly. TAFTA is a proposed free-trade area between EU and United States.

- ASEM – Asia–Europe Meeting
- ACP – African, Caribbean and Pacific Group of States (Economic Partnership Agreements)
- EuroLat – Euro-Latin American Parliamentary Assembly
- TAFTA – Transatlantic Free Trade Area

=== Other organisations in world ===
European countries like the United Kingdom, France, Spain, Portugal have made organisations with other countries in the world with which they have strong cultural and historical links.

Commonwealth of Nations

Francophonie

Ibero-American States

=== European languages in the world ===
English is considered to be the global lingua franca. European languages like English, French, Spanish, Portuguese, Italian, Russian and German are official, co-official or widely in use in many countries with a colonial past or with a European diaspora.

Anglophone

Francophone

Hispanophone

Lusophone

Italophone

Germanophone

=== World integration ===
WTO members

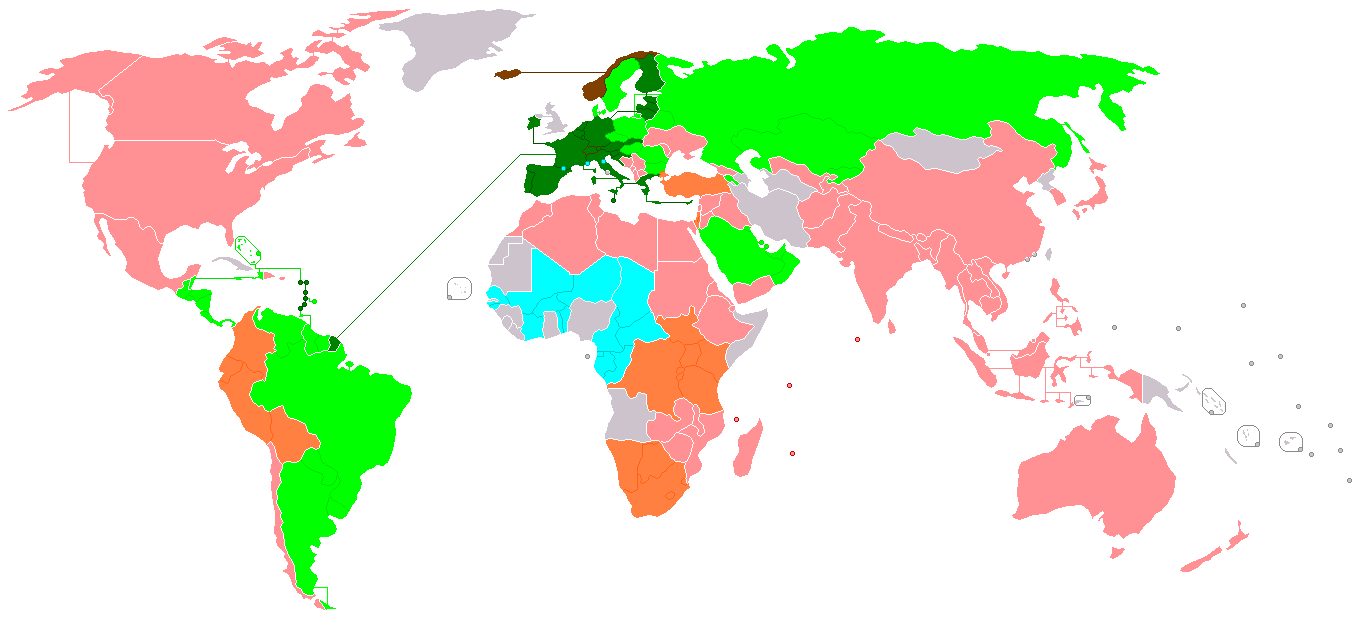
Economic integration

ICC members

Death penalty

Conscription

Paris Agreement

Same sex marriage

== See also ==
- Assembly of European Regions
- Centre Virtuel de la Connaissance sur l'Europe – Virtual Centre for Knowledge on Europe
- Differentiated integration
- European Federation
- European Policy Centre
- Europe Day
- EuroVoc
- Mechanism for Cooperation and Verification
- North American integration
- Pan-European identity
- Paneuropean Union
- Potential enlargement of the European Union
- Pulse of Europe
- Regions of Europe
- TRACECA
