= ECAC =

ECAC may refer to:

- Eastern College Athletic Conference, an American college sports conference
- ECAC Hockey, an American college ice hockey conference
- European Civil Aviation Conference, an intergovernmental civil air transport organization
