= European AIS Database =

Database of aeronautical information

The European Aeronautical Information Services Database (EAD) is a centralised reference database of quality-assured aeronautical information, which was developed by EUROCONTROL member states. AIS units as data providers maintain the aeronautical information under their responsibility whereas airspace users, acting as data users, retrieve, consult, and download such information.

The EAD provides instant access to the most up-to-date digital aeronautical information from the ECAC and ECAC+ areas, from Notices to Airmen (NOTAM), pre-flight information bulletins (PIB), briefing facility services and the AIP library.

The EAD is the world’s largest aeronautical information management (AIM) system.
