= Pilot deviation =

Breach of air traffic regulation or air traffic control instruction

Pilot deviations are actions of a pilot that result in the violation of an air traffic regulation, often a failure to follow instructions from air traffic control.

== Types ==
Pilot deviations can be split into ground- and airborne deviations.

- Examples of airborne deviations are when a pilot fails to report a compulsory reporting point or when a pilot strays from an assigned altitude or heading, or if they penetrate controlled airspace or restricted airspace without clearance. Another example is when a pilot goes beyond airspeed limits in certain areas such as a holding pattern, or when an aircraft is below 10,000 feet, or simply when the airspeed goes beyond what the ATC instructed.
- Examples of ground based deviations are taking off or landing without clearance, failing to hold short of a runway, deviating from an assigned taxi route, or when a runway incursion of any type occurs.

== Pilot deviation notification ==
A Brasher warning is a warning immediately issued to pilots by the air traffic controllers after a potential deviation by the former occurs. It was named after Captain Jack Brasher, a former Republic Airlines pilot who was accused of deviating from an assigned altitude on August 13, 1985. Jack Brasher was only notified six months later that the Federal Aviation Administration (FAA) had concerns over this incident and when he was interviewed, he stated that he had no recollection of what happened, given the amount of time passed after the event. Therefore, the FAA implemented the Brasher warning, or, as they refer it, the "Brasher Notification" or Pilot Deviation Notification.

== See also ==
- Federal Aviation Regulations
