= Flight Safety Foundation =

Non-profit organization advocating for aviation safety

- Abbreviation: FSF
- Formation: 1945; 81 years ago
- Legal status: Non profit organisation
- Purpose: Aviation safety research, education, advocacy
- Headquarters: Alexandria, Virginia
- Region served: International
- President & CEO: Dr. Hassan Shahidi
- Website: flightsafety.org

The Flight Safety Foundation (FSF) is a nonprofit, international organization concerning research, education, advocacy, and communications in the field of aviation safety. FSF brings together aviation professionals to help solve safety problems and bring an international perspective to aviation safety-related issues for the public.

== History ==
Since its founding in 1945, the foundation has acted as a non-profit, independent clearinghouse to disseminate safety information, identify threats to safety, and recommend practical solutions, like, for example, the Approach and Landing Accident Reduction (ALAR) toolkit. Today, the foundation provides leadership to more than 1000 members in more than 100 countries. The Aviation Crash Injury Research (AvCIR) Division initiated by Hugh DeHaven became part of FSF in April 1959, being transferred from Cornell University.

== Objectives ==
The main foundation's stated objectives are to:

- Anticipate, identify and analyze global aviation safety issues and set priorities
- Communicate effectively about aviation safety
- Promote necessary actions and adoption of best aviation safety practices

== Activities ==
=== Publication ===
- The FSF produces a digital journal titled AeroSafety World which has a controlled circulation that includes all FSF members as well as executives at air carriers, maintenance organizations, industry manufacturers and suppliers, and civil aviation authorities. AeroSafety World is only available electronically.
- The FSF also manages the SKYbrary project integrating safety-related publications

=== Seminars and awards ===
In partnership with aviation community, FSF organizes four annual summit:

- The International Aviation Safety Summit (IASS)
- The Business Aviation Safety Summit (BASS)
- The Asia Pacific Summit for Aviation Safety (AP-SAS)
- The Safety Forum

FSF also organizes and sponsors smaller, regional safety events throughout the year. The foundation gives out annual awards to recognize individual achievements and group achievements in aviation safety. FSF works with stakeholders in aviation safety promotion across the world such as the Civil Aviation Authority of Singapore (CAAS), the Civil Aviation Administration of China (CAAC), Eurocontrol the African Regional Airlines Association and the AviAssist Foundation

=== Aviation Safety Network ===
Aviation Safety Network
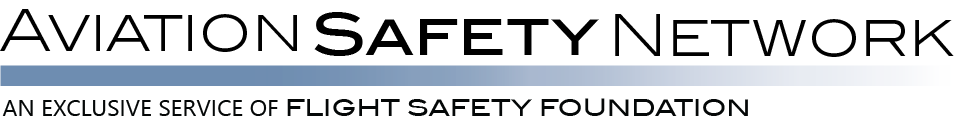
- Website type: Database
- Available in: English
- Owner: Flight Safety Foundation
- Creators: Harro Ranter; Fabian Lujan
- Website: aviation-safety.net
- Launched: January 1996; 30 years ago
- Current status: Active

The FSF manages the Aviation Safety Network (ASN), a website that keeps track of aviation accidents, incidents, and hijackings. Its main database contains details of over 23,000 reports (2022) and investigations, news, photos, and statistics. The website has 9900 subscribers and receives about 50,000 visitors per week.

ASN maintains three distinct databases:

- ASN Accident Database: Contains over 23,000 airliner reports (aircraft originally certified to carry 12 or more passengers) as well as military transport and corporate jet accidents dating back to 1919.
- ASN Wikibase: Contains descriptions of over 258,000 accidents and incidents involving light aircraft, military, helicopters, gyroplanes, gliders, hot air balloons and UAVs (unmanned aerial vehicles). It is updated regularly by a large user community.
- ASN Drone Database: Contains over 15,000 unmanned aircraft or drone sightings and incidents.

ASN was founded in January 1996 by Harro Ranter, who currently serves as director and Fabian I. Lujan who manages the website's operations. Harro started gathering information about aircraft accidents in 1983 and wrote a book covering over 1000 accidents in the summer of 1985. Lujan joined the Aviation Safety Web Pages in August 1998.
