= SKYbrary =

2008 wiki for aviation safety information

SKYbrary is a wiki created by the European Organisation for the Safety of Air Navigation, International Civil Aviation Organization, and the Flight Safety Foundation to create a comprehensive source of aviation safety information freely available online. It was launched in May 2008 on a platform based on MediaWiki. The Flight Safety Foundation (a founding member) defines SKYbrary's goal as: capturing authoritative aviation industry information and create cumulative knowledge, especially with regard to critical safety issues. HindSight Magazine related to SKYbrary received the Cecil A. Brownlow Publication Award in 2009 at the FSF International Air Safety Seminar (IASS).

== Methodology ==
SKYbrary is driven by a risk based knowledge management approach, meaning:

1. Information must be in the right place at the right time.
2. Managing knowledge helps ensure that organizations have appropriate capabilities in place (linking ability to innovate and capacity planning).
3. Effective management of knowledge helps organizations share best practice more effectively, avoiding duplication of effort, whatever the daily operational constraints.

SKYbrary's Management and Quality Assurance process is described in detail on Skybrary Content Management.

SKYbrary uses the Semantic MediaWiki extension to annotate semantic data within articles.

== Structure ==
The SKYbrary front page gives visitors access to aviation safety knowledge via three portals. Each portal then contains numerous categories of articles chosen because of their relevance to aviation safety professionals. Current categories in use:

=== Operational Issues ===
- Air-to-ground communication
- Airspace infringement
- Bird Strike
- Controlled flight into terrain
- Fire
- Ground Operations
- Human factors
- Level bust
- Loss of control
- Loss of separation
- Runway excursion
- Runway incursion
- Wake vortex turbulence
- Weather
- General

=== Enhancing Safety ===
- Airworthiness
- Flight Technical
- Safety Management
- Safety Nets
- Theory of Flight
- General

=== Safety Regulations ===
- Certification
- ESARRs
- Licensing
- Regulation
- General

=== Miscellaneous ===
- Author's Articles
- Accident and serious incident reports
- Help
