= Republic Airlines =

Airline of the United States (1979–1986)

IATA	ICAO	Call sign
RC	REP	REPUBLIC
- Founded: July 1, 1979 (amalgamation)
- Ceased operations: September 30, 1986 (merged into Northwest Airlines)
- Hubs: Detroit; Memphis; Minneapolis/St. Paul
- Frequent-flyer program: Perks Program
- Headquarters: Fort Snelling, Minnesota, U.S.
- Key people: Stephen Wolf (1984–1986)

Republic Airlines first logo, 1979–1984

Republic Airlines was an airline in the United States that operated from 1979 until it merged with Northwest Airlines in 1986. Republic was formed by the merger of North Central Airlines and Southern Airways on July 1, 1979. Their headquarters were at Minneapolis–Saint Paul International Airport, in what is now Fort Snelling in unincorporated Hennepin County, Minnesota. The former headquarters is now Delta Air Lines Building C.

== History ==
Republic Airlines began in 1979 with the merger of North Central Airlines and Southern Airways, the first such merger following the federal Airline Deregulation Act. The new airline's headquarters were at Minneapolis–Saint Paul International Airport where it operated a major hub, however, their largest hub was at Detroit Metropolitan Wayne County Airport. A third hub was also operated at Memphis International Airport. Following their buyout of Hughes Airwest in 1980, Republic became the largest airline in the U.S. by number of airports served. New hubs formerly operated by Hughes Airwest were also acquired at Phoenix Sky Harbor International Airport and at Las Vegas McCarran International Airport.

The company operated the world's largest McDonnell Douglas DC-9 fleet, with DC-9-10, DC-9-30 and DC-9-50s and also flew Boeing 727-200, Boeing 757-200, and McDonnell Douglas MD-80 jets. In addition, Republic operated Convair 580 turboprops previously flown by North Central.

After the merger, losses mounted and service reductions followed. Saddled with debt from two acquisitions and new aircraft, the airline struggled in the early 1980s, and even introduced a human mascot version of Herman the Duck. They reduced service to Phoenix and Las Vegas, former hubs of Hughes Airwest, citing their inability to compete with non-union airlines there, and eventually dismantled the former extensive route system operated by Hughes Airwest in the western U.S. As a result, this caused the airline’s image to worsen at a sensitive time, and the airline was sometimes derided as "Repulsive".

In early 1985 Republic teamed up with Simmons Airlines and Express Airlines I to provide feeder service from dozens of smaller cities to Republic's three main hub airports at Detroit, Memphis, and Minneapolis. The service was known as Republic Express using turboprop aircraft that were painted as Republic Airlines, accommodating from 14 to 34 passengers.

=== Northwest Airlines ===
In 1986, Northwest Orient Airlines announced on January 23 that they would buy Republic for $884 million in response to United Airlines' purchase of the Pacific routes of Pan American World Airways and to provide domestic feed. Opposed by the Justice Department, the Northwest-Republic merger was approved by the Transportation Department on July 31 and was completed on October 1, with Northwest dropping the word Orient from their name after the merger. Northwest merged Republic's hub at Minneapolis, with its existing hub there, and retained Republic's hubs at Memphis, and Detroit. Together, they became the backbone of Northwest's domestic network.

Northwest later merged with Delta Air Lines in October 2008; the deal was finalized in January 2010, with Delta as the surviving air carrier. Delta initially retained the former Republic hubs, but dehubbed Memphis in 2013.

== Frequent flyer program ==
In October 1984 Republic introduced a new frequent flyer program called the Perks program. The new program eliminated the need to place a frequent flyer account number sticker on each flight ticket coupon, with earned mileage automatically being assigned to accounts if the reservation was booked directly with Republic. Each flight segment earned a minimum of 1,000 miles or the actual mileage, if greater. A domestic round trip reward ticket was automatically issued every 20,000 miles. The new program included a partnership with Pan American World Airways for earning and redeeming mileage awards. In January 1986, Western Airlines was added as a partner. Effective October 1, 1986, the Republic Perks frequent flyer program was merged into Northwest Airlines which adopted the WorldPerks program name, taken from Republic.

== Fleet ==
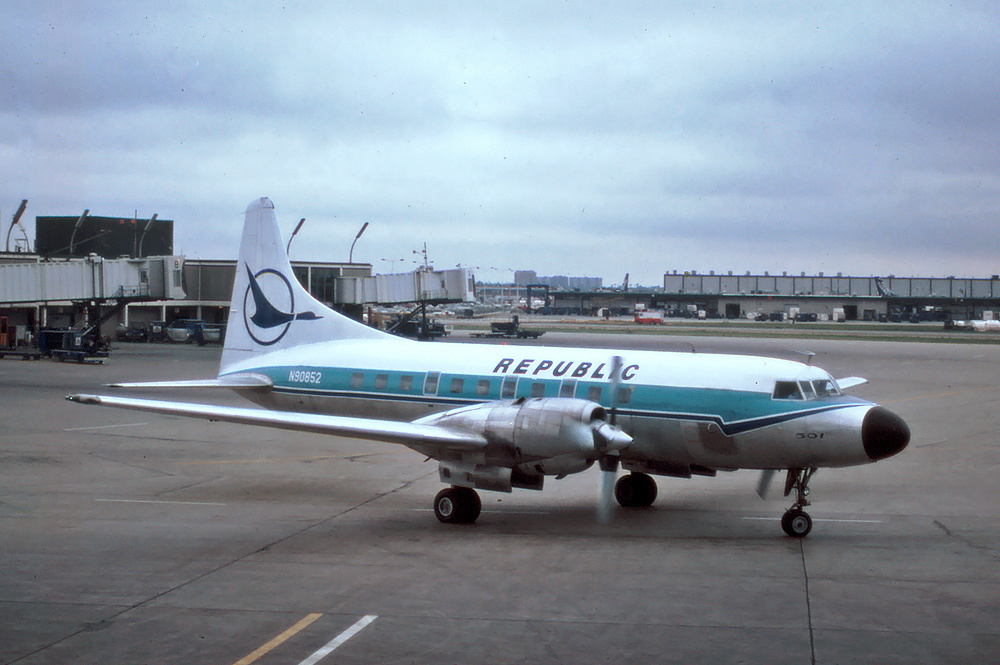
Republic Convair 580 in 1979

- 133 Douglas DC-9-14; Douglas DC-9-15; McDonnell Douglas DC-9-31; McDonnell Douglas DC-9-32; McDonnell Douglas DC-9-51
- 22 Boeing 727-200
- 8 McDonnell Douglas MD-82
- 6 Boeing 757-200
- 24 Convair CV-580 turboprop aircraft

== Destinations in 1986 ==
According to the Republic Airlines system route map dated March 2, 1986, the airline was serving the following domestic and international destinations shortly before the merger with Northwest Airlines:

=== Domestic ===
Alabama

- Birmingham
- Huntsville/Decatur
- Mobile
- Montgomery

Arizona

- Phoenix – Phoenix Sky Harbor International Airport (previously a hub immediately following the acquisition of Hughes Airwest in 1980; sold to startup carrier America West Airlines in 1983)
- Tucson

Arkansas

- Little Rock

California

- Los Angeles – Los Angeles International Airport (previously a hub immediately following the acquisition of Hughes Airwest in 1980)
- Orange County (SNA, now John Wayne Airport)
- Sacramento
- San Diego
- San Francisco – San Francisco International Airport (previously a hub immediately following the acquisition of Hughes Airwest in 1980)

Colorado

- Denver – Stapleton International Airport

Connecticut

- Hartford – Bradley International Airport

Florida

- Fort Lauderdale
- Fort Walton Beach
- Miami
- Orlando – Orlando International Airport (previously a focus city immediately following the merger of North Central Airlines and Southern Airways in 1979)
- Panama City – Panama City–Bay County International Airport
- Sarasota
- Tampa

Georgia

- Atlanta – Hartsfield–Jackson Atlanta International Airport (previously a hub immediately following the merger of North Central Airlines and Southern Airways in 1979 but no longer a hub in 1986)

Illinois

- Chicago – Chicago O'Hare International Airport (previously a hub immediately following the merger of North Central Airlines and Southern Airways in 1979)

Indiana

- Fort Wayne
- Indianapolis
- South Bend

Iowa

- Cedar Rapids
- Des Moines

Kansas

- Wichita – Wichita Dwight D. Eisenhower National Airport

Kentucky

- Louisville – Louisville Muhammad Ali International Airport

Louisiana

- Baton Rouge
- New Orleans – Louis Armstrong New Orleans International Airport (previously a focus city immediately following the merger of North Central Airlines and Southern Airways in 1979)
- Shreveport

Maryland

- Baltimore – Baltimore/Washington International Thurgood Marshall Airport

Massachusetts

- Boston – Boston Logan International Airport

Michigan

- Detroit – Detroit Metropolitan Wayne County Airport – Hub
- Grand Rapids
- Kalamazoo
- Lansing
- Saginaw

Minnesota

- Duluth
- Hibbing
- International Falls
- Minneapolis – Minneapolis–Saint Paul International Airport – Hub & airline headquarters
- Rochester

Mississippi

- Gulfport/Biloxi
- Meridian
- Pascagoula – served via Mobile, AL

Missouri

- Kansas City
- St. Louis – St. Louis Lambert International Airport

Nebraska

- Omaha

Nevada

- Las Vegas – Harry Reid International Airport (previously a hub immediately following the acquisition of Hughes Airwest in 1980; sold to startup carrier America West Airlines in 1983)

New York

- Albany
- Buffalo
- New York City
  - John F. Kennedy International Airport
  - LaGuardia Airport
- Rochester
- Syracuse – Syracuse Hancock International Airport
- White Plains

North Dakota

- Bismarck
- Fargo
- Grand Forks
- Minot

Ohio

- Akron/Canton
- Cincinnati – Cincinnati/Northern Kentucky International Airport
- Cleveland – Cleveland Hopkins International Airport
- Columbus – John Glenn Columbus International Airport
- Dayton – Dayton International Airport

Oklahoma

- Oklahoma City
- Tulsa

Oregon

- Portland

Pennsylvania

- Erie
- Philadelphia
- Pittsburgh

South Dakota

- Rapid City
- Sioux Falls

Tennessee

- Chattanooga
- Knoxville
- Memphis – Memphis International Airport - Hub
- Nashville

Texas

- Dallas – Dallas Fort Worth International Airport
- Houston
  - William P. Hobby Airport
  - George Bush Intercontinental Airport

Utah

- Salt Lake City – Salt Lake City International Airport (previously a focus city immediately following the acquisition of Hughes Airwest in 1980)

Washington, D.C. / Virginia

- Washington Dulles International Airport
- Ronald Reagan Washington National Airport

Washington state

- Seattle – Seattle–Tacoma International Airport (previously a hub immediately following the acquisition of Hughes Airwest in 1980)

Wisconsin

- Appleton
- Eau Claire
- Green Bay
- La Crosse
- Madison
- Milwaukee – Milwaukee Mitchell International Airport (previously a focus city immediately following the merger of North Central Airlines and Southern Airways in 1979; sold to startup carrier Midwest Airlines in 1984)
- Wausau

=== International ===
Canada

- Calgary, Alberta – Calgary International Airport
- Edmonton, Alberta – Edmonton International Airport
- Montreal, Quebec – Montréal–Dorval International Airport
- Toronto, Ontario – Toronto Pearson International Airport
- Winnipeg, Manitoba – Winnipeg James Armstrong Richardson International Airport

Cayman Islands

- Grand Cayman

Mexico

- Cancun
- Puerto Vallarta
- Mazatlan
- Guadalajara

== Incident ==
The airline had a high safety rating, but incurred a passenger fatality in 1983 when a section of propeller blade entered the cabin of Flight 927 at Brainerd, Minnesota on Sunday, January 9. Arriving from Minneapolis in sleet and snow showers at 7:40 p.m., the Convair 580 skidded off the right edge of the runway and the right propeller struck a snowbank. Three other passengers were injured, one seriously. Following this incident, the airline had a number of close calls in 1983. In 1985, a pilot for the airline named Jack Brasher deviated 700 feet from an assigned altitude in flight. As a result, a warning was issued to him months later. The warning would be named after him - the Brasher warning.

== See also ==
- List of defunct airlines of the United States
- Revenue Technology Services (1982)
