= Revenue Technology Services =

- Company type: Corporation
- Industry: Travel Solutions
- Founded: 1982
- Headquarters: Plano, Texas
- Number of employees: NA
- Website: www.rtscorp.com

Revenue Technology Solutions began as a division Control Data Corporation. It developed a yield management system for Republic Airlines on a mainframe in 1982. Revenue Technology Services Corporation was spun off as an independent company through a purchase by YMS, Inc. in 1991.

Revenue Technology Services provides global revenue management and profit optimization software and consulting services. The verticals supported are airlines, cargo, coach, cruise/ferry lines, and railroads. Delivered products include revenue management for passenger and cargo, pricing management and business intelligence / analytics.
