= Controlled and Harmonised Aeronautical Information Network =

The Controlled and Harmonised Aeronautical Information Network (abbreviated: CHAIN) is a concept developed by EUROCONTROL to improve the quality, integrity, accuracy and interoperability of aeronautical data in kind of a digital data chain avoiding changes in medium in the whole data process.

Using CHAIN, regulators of aeronautical information as well as service providers (ANSPs) can be supported implementing and maintaining traceable, controlled and auditable processes in compliance with ICAO Annex 15 requirements for data quality with a focus on data integrity.

The scope of CHAIN covers flight critical and essential navigational aeronautical data (e.g. runway threshold coordinates and heights) as established in ICAO Annex 15, supplemented by the industry standards EUROCAE ED-76 and ED-77.
