= ECIP =

Plan developed by EUROCONTROL

The European Convergence and Implementation Plan (ECIP) is a plan developed by EUROCONTROL with common actions to be implemented by the participated states in order to improve Air Traffic Management (ATM) services within the period stipulated. Activities relate to all aspects of the ATM domain such as airspace organization and management, aeronautical information systems (AIM), safety regulation and environment.

The ECIP document is used as a medium-term planning tool for the stakeholders that focuses on necessary changes over the next five to seven years.

The ECIP has been replaced by ESSIP, the European Single Sky ImPlementation plan.
