= Military airspace =

Military airspace is any area in which military aircraft are present and participate in a variety of activities. There are many kinds of airspace.

== Military operating areas ==
A military operations area (MOA) is a zone in which military aircraft conduct non-hazardous exercises. It is highly recommended that pilots check for information on the MOA before proceeding into the zone.

== Controlled firing zones ==
Controlled firing zones are operated in such a way that they do not interfere with and/or pose a threat to civilian aircraft.

== Alert areas ==
Alert areas are zones where unusual air exercises like pilot training are performed. Once again pilots are advised to contact the area prior to entering.
