= European Common Aviation Area =

Single market for commercial aviation services

Member countries of the ECAA are shown in dark and medium shades. ECAC, Eurocontrol, ECAA, EU ECAC, Eurocontrol, ECAA ECAC, Eurocontrol ECAC

The European Common Aviation Area (ECAA) is a single market in aviation services.

ECAA agreements were signed on 5 May 2006 in Salzburg, Austria between the EU and some external countries. It built upon the EU's acquis communautaire and the European Economic Area. The ECAA liberalizes the air transport industry by allowing any company from any ECAA member state to fly between any ECAA member states airports, thereby allowing a "foreign" airline to provide domestic flights.

ECAA states and EMAA aviation agreements. ECAA founding states ECAA states which joined later other European aviation agreement EMAA signed negotiations with EU

== Membership ==
=== Founding members ===
On 9 June 2006, the ECAA agreement was signed by almost all of the 27 EU members, the European Union itself, Albania, Bosnia and Herzegovina, Croatia, Iceland, Montenegro, North Macedonia, Norway, Serbia as well as Kosovo (UNMIK as Kosovo representative under Security Council resolution 1244). The last two EU member states to sign it were Slovakia and Latvia respectively on 13 June 2006 and 22 June 2006.

=== Enlargements ===
Further agreements to join the Common Aviation Area have been offered to the EU's Eastern Partnership members. Agreements currently in force, include:

- Georgia signed a CAA on 2 December 2010.
- Moldova signed on 26 June 2012.
- Ukraine and the EU signed a Common Aviation Area agreement on 12 October 2021, as part of the 23rd Ukraine-EU summit in Kyiv. The Prime Minister of Ukraine Denys Shmyhal, the Ambassador of Slovenia (then the EU Presidency) to Ukraine Tomaž Mentzin and the Head of the EU Foreign Service Josep Borrell signed the agreement.
- Armenia started negotiations to join after a new Armenia-EU partnership agreement was signed in February 2017. Armenia and the EU finalized negotiations on 15 November 2021, with the signing of a Common Aviation Area Agreement between the two sides at a ceremony in Brussels.

=== Under negotiation ===
- Azerbaijan – In 2013, Azerbaijan started negotiations.

== Euro-Mediterranean aviation agreements (EMAAs) ==
Moreover, a system of association agreements with the ECAA has been enacted for the Mediterranean partnership countries.

=== In force ===
- Morocco signed its Euro-Mediterranean Aviation Agreement (EMAA) with the EU on 12 December 2006.
- Jordan signed its Euro-Mediterranean Aviation Agreement (EMAA) with the EU on 15 December 2010.
- Israel signed its Euro-Mediterranean Aviation Agreement (EMAA) with the EU on 10 June 2013.

=== Under negotiation ===
- Lebanon – On 9 October 2008, the Council of the European Union adopted a decision authorizing the European Commission to open negotiations.
- Algeria – On 9 December 2008, the Council of the European Union adopted a decision authorizing the European Commission to open negotiations, though the negotiations with Algeria have not started yet.
- Tunisia – On 27 June 2013, Tunisia started its negotiations.

== Brexit ==
Because the UK left the European Union (Brexit), the UK is no longer part of the Common Aviation Area. Permission or new treaties with the UK needed to be made so that aviation to and from the UK wouldn't stop. There was a delay in this hard Brexit until the end of 2020, because the Brexit withdrawal agreement states that most EU rules continue to be valid for the UK during 2020. However, EU approved regulations 2019/494 and 2019/505 in order to secure air traffic between UK and EU plus EEA. Also, the British government took various steps to ensure the continuation of air travel, such as an open skies agreement with the United States. The British airline EasyJet, which has many flights outside the UK, set up a subsidiary in Austria (easyJet Europe) whilst keeping its headquarters in Luton, England.

== See also ==
- Single European Sky
