= Antje Wiener =

Political scientist

Antje Wiener is a German political scientist and international relations scholar. Since 2009, she has held the chair of Political Science, especially Global Governance at the University of Hamburg. With her research, Wiener contributes to international relations theory, critical constructivist norms research, and contestation theory. Empirically, her research focusses on human rights and the rule of law in both a European and a global context. She has also investigated the contestation and constitution of the prohibition of sexual violence, the international prohibition of torture, and various norms of international security governance.

== Studies and academic career ==
Wiener earned her diploma in political science at the Free University of Berlin and received her PhD from Carleton University, with a dissertation entitled "Building institutions: the developing practice of European citizenship". Before coming to Hamburg, she has held chairs in International Studies at Queen’s University Belfast and the University of Bath and has taught at the Universities of Stanford, Carleton, Sussex and Hannover.

Wiener is a Fellow of the British Academy of Social Sciences (FAcSS) since 2011 and a Member of the Academia Europea (MAE) since 2020, and she has been an elected By-Fellow of Hughes Hall, University of Cambridge since 2017. From 2001 to 2010, she served on the Executive Committee of the Standing Group for International Relations of the European Consortium for Political Research (ECPR), and from 2013 to 2015 and 2018 to 2021, she served as an elected member of the executive board of the German Political Science Association (DVPW). Wiener was a PI of the research training project "Democratising Security in Turbulent Times", a collaboration of the German Institute for Global and Area Studies, Helmut-Schmidt-University, the Institute for Peace Research and Security Policy Hamburg and the University of Hamburg, which ran from 2020 to 2024.

Various fellowships have led her to Stanford University, the Robert Schuman Centre at the European University Institute in Florence, as well as to the University of Cambridge, the Netherlands Institute for Advanced Study (NIAS) in Amsterdam, the Hanse-Institute for Advanced Studies (HWK) in Delmenhorst, the Institute for Advanced Studies in the Humanities (IASH) in Edinburgh and the Centre for Global Studies (CFGS) at the University of Victoria. She was also a recipient of a two-year Opus Magnum Fellowship of the Volkswagen Foundation in 2015-2017. Together with James Tully, Wiener is a founding editor of the journal "Global Constitutionalism" which has been published with Cambridge University Press since 2012, and together with Richard Bellamy, Guy Peters and Jon Pierce, she served as a founding Associate Editor of the European Political Science Review (EPSR) in 2009.

== Research ==
Antje Wiener’s research can be situated at the interface of critical constructivist norms research in International Relations, international law, and international political theory. Her work centres on how the contestation and interpretation of, as well as the critical engagement with international norms can guarantee (or restore) their democratic legitimacy. A key question she explores is how access to contestation can be achieved for all affected stakeholders under conditions of global cultural diversity. In 2017, a symposium in the peer-reviewed academic journal Polity discussed her work on contestation and international relations. Several leading scholars in these fields discussed Wiener's "important intervention into the field of international norms" and put forward constructive criticisms of her work.

In her work, Antje Wiener draws on a multiplicity of theoretical approaches besides constructivism, including international practice theory as well as post-/decolonial and feminist thought. By exploring the interplay of normativity and diversity in the global realm, she has taken an active role in advancing Amitav Acharya’s "Global IR" project, an emerging research programme which seeks to transcend the divide between "the West and the rest" in the discipline of International Relations and currently serves on the Advisory Board of the International Studies Association’s Global International Relations Section (GIRS). More recently, as a co-chair in the Hamburg-based Cluster of Excellence "Climate, Climatic Change, and Society" (CLICCS), Wiener has been conducting research on global climate justice as well as non-state actors in global climate governance.

== Selected publications ==
- Wiener, Antje (1999). European Citizenship Practice. Boulder, Colo: Westview Press. ISBN 978-0-8133-3689-3.
- Christiansen, Thomas; Jorgensen, Knud Erik; Wiener, Antje (1999). "The social construction of Europe". Journal of European Public Policy. 6 (4): 528–544. doi:10.1080/135017699343450. ISSN 1350-1763.
- Wiener, Antje (2004). "Contested Compliance: Interventions on the Normative Structure of World Politics". European Journal of International Relations. 10 (2): 189–234. doi:10.1177/1354066104042934. ISSN 1354-0661.
- Wiener, Antje (2014). A Theory of Contestation. SpringerBriefs in Political Science. Berlin, Heidelberg: Springer Berlin Heidelberg. doi:10.1007/978-3-642-55235-9. ISBN 978-3-642-55234-2.
- Wiener, Antje (2018). Contestation and constitution of norms in global international relations. Cambridge, New York, Port Melbourne, New Delhi, Singapore: Cambridge University Press. ISBN 978-1-316-71859-9.
