= Eurocontrol =

European air traffic organisation

European Organisation for the Safety of Air Navigation

- Formation: 1963
- Headquarters: Brussels, Belgium
- Members: 42 member states
- Budget: €505.8 million (as of 2014)
- Employees: 1,945 (as of 2014)
- Website: eurocontrol.int

The European Organisation for the Safety of Air Navigation, commonly known as Eurocontrol (stylised EUROCONTROL), is an international organisation working to achieve safe and seamless air traffic management across Europe. Founded in 1963, Eurocontrol currently has 42 member states with headquarters in Brussels, Belgium. It has several local sites as well, including an Innovation Hub in Brétigny-sur-Orge, France, the Aviation Learning Centre (ALC) in Luxembourg, and the Maastricht Upper Area Control Centre (MUAC) in Maastricht, the Netherlands. The organisation employs approximately two thousand people, and operates with an annual budget in excess of half a billion euros.

Although Eurocontrol is not an agency of the European Union, the EU has delegated parts of its Single European Sky regulations to Eurocontrol, making it the central organisation for coordination and planning of air traffic control for all of Europe. The EU itself is a signatory of Eurocontrol and all EU member states are presently also members of Eurocontrol. The organisation works with national authorities, air navigation service providers, civil and military airspace users, airports, and other organisations. Its activities involve all gate-to-gate air navigation service operations: strategic and tactical flow management, controller training, regional control of airspace, safety-proofed technologies and procedures, and collection of air navigation charges.

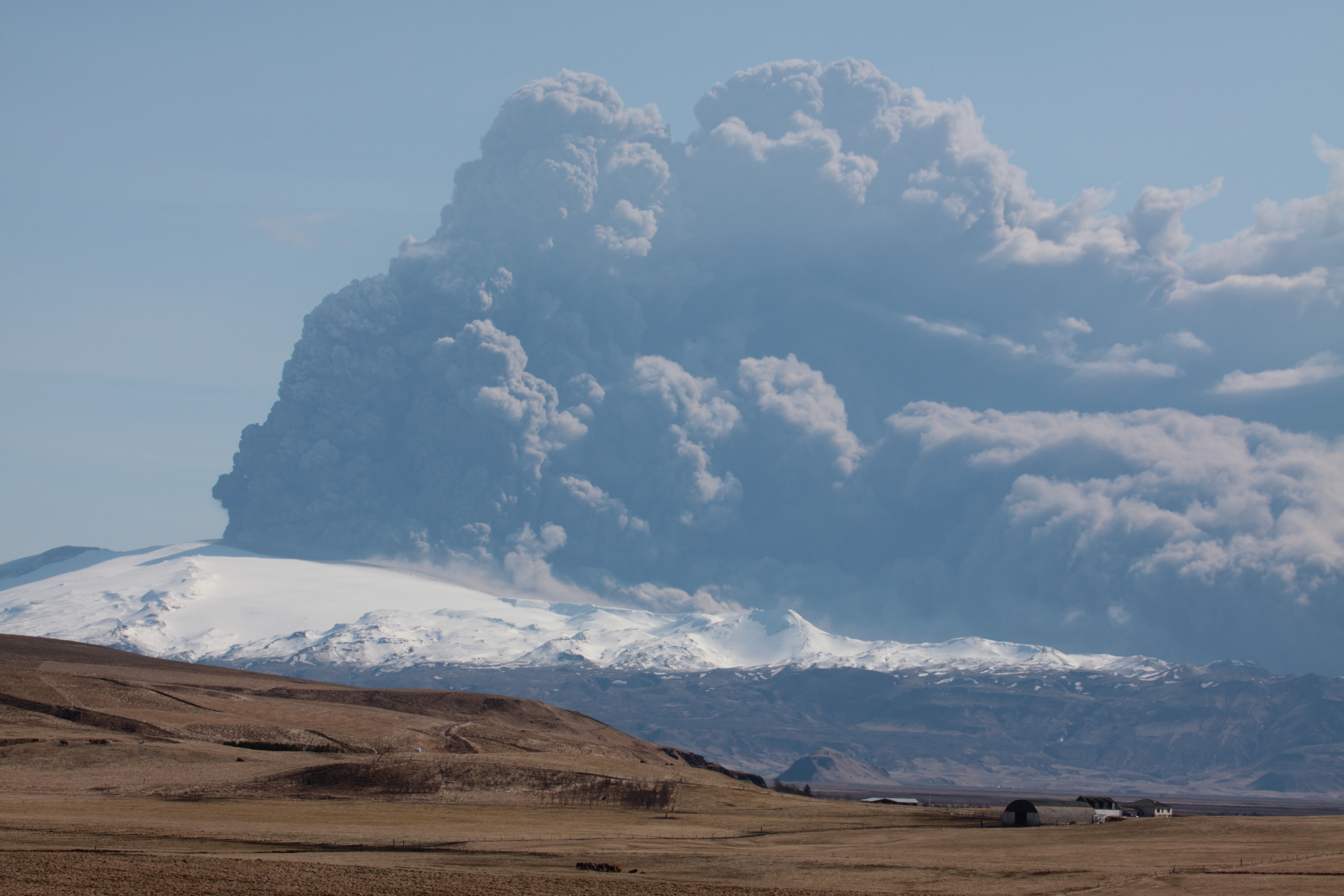
The eruption of Eyjafjallajökull in 2010 disrupted air traffic over large parts of Europe

Eurocontrol takes center stage in managing air traffic disruptions within Europe to guarantee the continuity of safe and efficient air operations during crises. For instance, the 2010 Icelandic Volcanic Ash Crisis saw the involvement of Eurocontrol in providing relevant data to the national authorities and air traffic control agencies to reduce airspace closure to a minimum. Moreover, during the COVID-19 pandemic, Eurocontrol supported the monitoring of the steep decline in air traffic through strategic responses toward the adjustment of flight plans and, therefore, mitigating operational challenges. Much of these efforts are managed through the Network Manager function of Eurocontrol, which enables the real-time monitoring of air traffic and oversees the implementation of contingency plans during emergencies such as natural calamities, industrial strikes, and adverse weather. This would be the necessary central coordination that sustains the resilience of Europe's air traffic network during crises.

== History ==
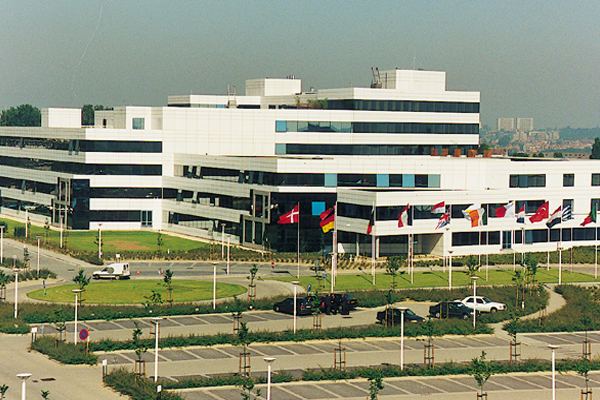
Headquarters of Eurocontrol in Brussels

The Eurocontrol Convention was signed in 1960 and ratified in 1963. Before the convention entered into force in 1963, there were already indications that the matter of national sovereignty would complicate the full implementation of the organisation's founding mission. The first European plan for a harmonised air traffic control (ATC) system, proposed in 1962, was beset by the refusal of both France and Britain to comply, largely due to reasons closely linked with their national military airspace control. The other four original members (the Federal Republic of Germany, Belgium, the Netherlands and Luxembourg) agreed in 1964 to set up a single international air traffic control centre to manage their upper airspace, settling in the Dutch city of Maastricht.

The European Parliament at the time expressed concern about the lack of clear intergovernmental agreements to ensure common air traffic control services across the continent. In 1979, Eurocontrol signed a working cooperation agreement with the European Commission, attempting to create a synergy of Eurocontrol's technical expertise and EU's regulatory authorities. Several initiatives originating in this period become a lasting element of the organisation, such as the Eurocontrol forecasting service, which became STATFOR, as well as the Aeronautical Information Service. By 1986, the pressure on the European ATC network was so big that a new, wider mandate was already being considered for Eurocontrol, with much of the initiative coming from ECAC’s Ministers of Transport. Subsequently, ECAC urged all of its member states to join Eurocontrol.

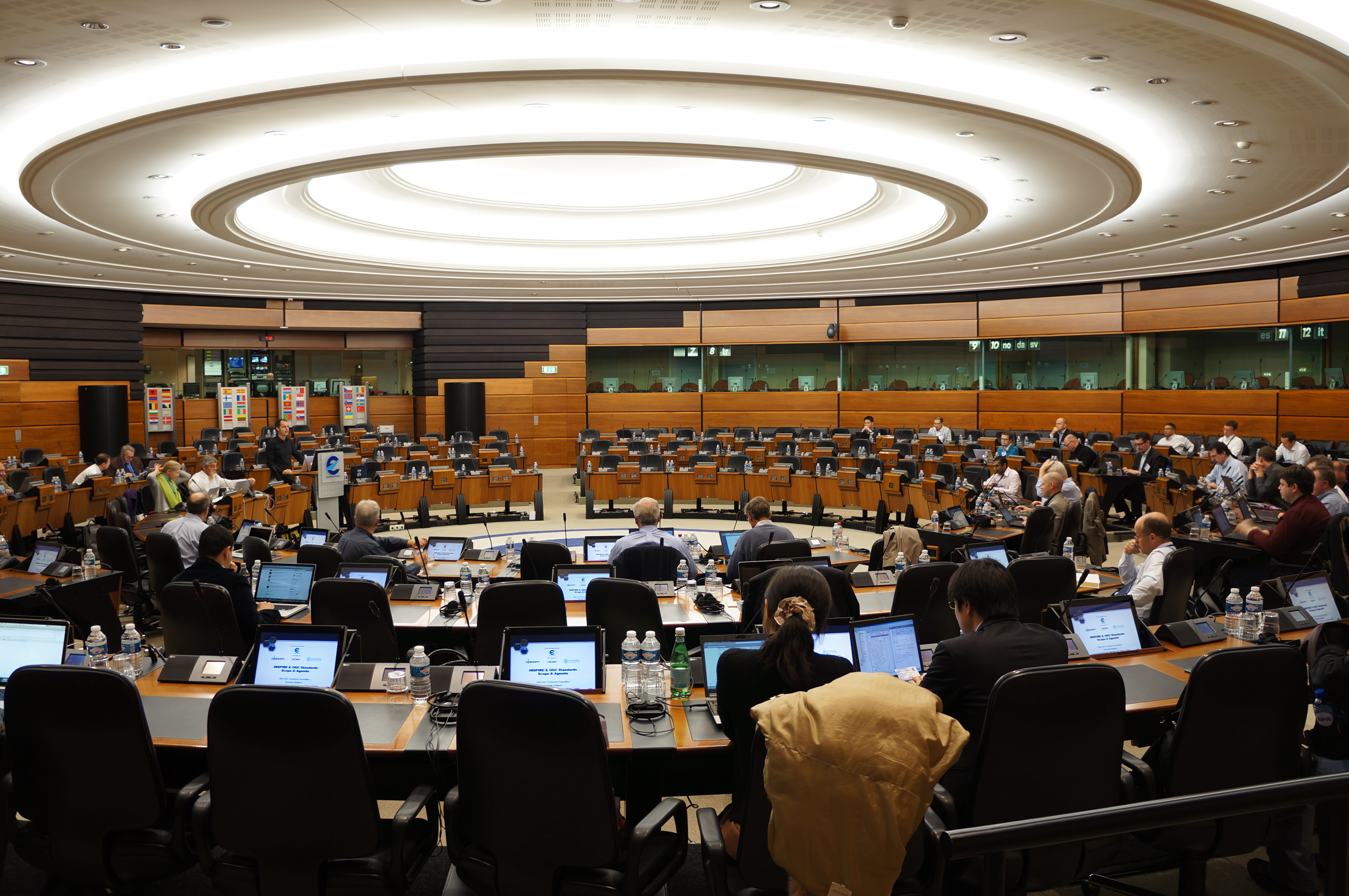
A meeting of Eurocontrol members

A revised Eurocontrol Convention was signed in 1997, renewing the organisation's optimism for greater political support, surpassing the original vision of the 1960 Convention. In June 1998, Eurocontrol, the European Space Agency (ESA) and the European Commission (EC) also signed an agreement formalising cooperation in the realm of satellite navigation systems and services. In 1999 the European Commission presented its plan for a Single European Sky (SES) to the European Parliament, followed by two high-Level groups (HLG). The HLG reports on SES led to the establishment of the European Aviation Safety Agency (EASA) and reinforced the European Commission's role as the sole European aviation safety regulator, while acknowledging Eurocontrol's technical expertise in the implementation of said regulations.

The early 2000s were marred by several fatal accidents in Europe, such as the 2001 Linate Airport runway collision and the 2002 Überlingen mid-air collision, both of which were related to air traffic navigation shortcomings. The pressure was further compounded by the September 11 attacks, increasing the need for a rapid Europe-wide regulatory and coordinating body. By May 2003, Eurocontrol and NATO had signed a memorandum of cooperation, followed by a similar memorandum with the European Commission in December 2003. In February 2004, Eurocontrol started work on first mandates from the European Commission and in April 2004, it adopted the Single European Sky Regulations (Package 1). In March 2006, the European Commission's Single European Sky ATM Research (SESAR) Program was launched by the Stakeholder Consultation Group (SCG) under Eurocontrol's aegis.

== Functions and centres ==
Eurocontrol provides a set of different services:

- Maastricht Upper Area Control Centre (MUAC)
- Network Manager Operations Centre (NMOC) – coordinates flight plans and actual traffic.
- EAD – centralised access to AIS information.
- Central Route Charges Office (CRCO) – collects en-route (and aerodrome approach) charges on behalf of Air Navigation Service providers (ANSPs).
- Eurocontrol Innovation Hub (EIH)– research, simulations, drones and UAM.
- EUROCONTROL Aviation Learning Centre (ALC) – training and e-learning.

=== Maastricht Upper Area Control Centre ===
Eurocontrol's Maastricht Upper Area Control Centre (MUAC), ICAO designator EDYY, located at Maastricht Aachen Airport, provides air traffic control for traffic above 24,500 ft over Belgium, Luxembourg, the Netherlands, and north-west Germany. In 2017 it became the first multinational, cross-border, civil-military, air navigation service provider since it integrated the military air traffic control of the German and Dutch upper airspace.

It is the third busiest upper area area control centre (ACC) in Europe after the London Area Control Centre and Karlsruhe ACC in terms of traffic numbers, but the first in terms of flight hours and distance.

MUAC has put in operation innovative technology and productivity enhancements: a new generation Flight Data Processing System, Integrated Flow Management Position, the Short Term Conflict Alert (STCA), Controller Pilot Data Link Communications (CPDLC) and stripless controller working positions.

Typically, air traffic control sectors at MUAC can handle 55 or more flights per hour. The average flight duration is approximately 21 minutes and typically 80% of the traffic is climbing from or descending to the major European airports of London, Brussels, Paris, Frankfurt, Amsterdam and Berlin. Maastricht UAC has undoubtedly one of the most complex airspace structures in the world and the traffic flow (up to 5,670 aircraft a day) can be disrupted by the many surrounding military airspaces.

== Membership criteria ==
Overlap of organisational memberships among Eurocontrol members – Eurocontrol members shown in shades of blue: ECAC, Eurocontrol, ECAA, EU ECAC, Eurocontrol, ECAA ECAC, Eurocontrol ECAC

To be considered for membership of Eurocontrol, a country must meet all of the following criteria:

- Be European
- Member of the Council of Europe
- Have existing accreditation to both ICAO and ECAC

=== List of members ===
Member	Since	Relationship with the EU
Belgium	1963	EU Member
France	1963	EU Member
Germany	1963	EU Member
Luxembourg	1963	EU Member
Netherlands	1963	EU Member
United Kingdom	1963	Former EU Member
Ireland	1965	EU Member
Portugal	1986	EU Member
Greece	1988	EU Member
Malta	1989	EU Member
Turkey	1989	EU Candidate
Cyprus	1991	EU Member
Hungary	1992	EU Member
Switzerland	1992	Has bilateral treaties with EU, including Schengen and enforcement of EU passenger rights.
Austria	1993	EU Member
Denmark	1994	EU Member
Norway	1994	EEA Member
Slovenia	1995	EU Member
Sweden	1995	EU Member
Czech Republic	1996	EU Member
Romania	1996	EU Member
Italy	1996	EU Member
Slovakia	1997	EU Member
Spain	1997	EU Member
Monaco	1997	
Bulgaria	1997	EU Member
Croatia	1997	EU Member
North Macedonia	1998	EU Candidate
Moldova	2000	EU Candidate
Finland	2001	EU Member
European Union	2002	In parallel with member states
Albania	2002	EU Candidate
Ukraine	2004	EU Candidate
Poland	2004	EU Member
Bosnia and Herzegovina	2004	EU Candidate
Serbia	2005	EU Candidate
Lithuania	2006	EU Member
Armenia	2006	
Montenegro	2007	EU Candidate
Latvia	2011	EU Member
Georgia	2012	EU Candidate
Estonia	2015	EU Member
Iceland	2025	EEA Member

=== Comprehensive Agreement States ===
In addition to membership, EUROCONTROL also concludes the so-called Comprehensive Agreements, which enhances the organisation's cooperation with non-European countries that are closely tied to the continent's aviation network.

Member	Since	Notes
Morocco	April 29, 2016	
Israel	June 2, 2016	

== See also ==
- Air travel disruption after the 2010 Eyjafjallajökull eruption
- Controlled and Harmonised Aeronautical Information Network (CHAIN)
- E-Learning Developers' Community of Practice
- European Union Aviation Safety Agency (EASA)
- European Civil Aviation Conference (ECAC)
- European Cockpit Association
- European Common Aviation Area (ECAA)
- The European Convergence and Implementation Plan (ECIP)
- List of the busiest airports in Europe by passenger traffic
- Single European Sky
- SKYbrary
- Weather Information Exchange Model
