= Comparative political theory =

Academic subfield

Comparative political theory, comparative political thought, or comparative political philosophy, is a subfield of political theory that expands the traditional boundaries of Western-centric political philosophy to incorporate insights from non-Western traditions, indigenous philosophies, and cross-cultural dialogues. Comparative political theory seeks to understand political concepts, ideologies, and practices across various cultural, historical, and intellectual contexts. It also aims to create a richer, more inclusive understanding of politics by comparing and engaging with philosophical systems from diverse global traditions.

== Historical context ==
The origins of political theory are deeply rooted in Western philosophical traditions, such as the works of Plato, Aristotle, Hobbes, Locke, Rousseau, Kant, and Marx. Historically, political theory was often limited to European and Anglo-American thought, with little engagement in non-Western traditions. However, the 20th century saw an increasing recognition of global intellectual diversity and the limitations of Eurocentrism. Decolonization movements and postcolonial studies further challenged Western dominance in academia and opened up space for comparative political theory to emerge as a distinct field in the 1990s.

Prominent thinkers like Amartya Sen and Leo Strauss laid the groundwork for comparative political theory by exploring themes like justice, liberty, and democracy across different cultural traditions. In addition, Edward Said’s concept of "Orientalism" highlighted the importance of critical engagement with how Western thought perceived and misrepresented non-Western societies. These developments inspired scholars to compare political ideas across civilizations without privileging any single tradition.

== Objectives ==
Comparative political theory has several key objectives:

- Expanding Canonical Boundaries: By engaging with diverse philosophical traditions, comparative political theory challenges the dominance of Western political theory and encourages a more pluralistic and inclusive understanding of political thought.
- Cross-Cultural Dialogue: comparative political theory promotes conversations between different intellectual traditions, fostering understanding and learning across cultural divides. This dialogue helps identify common themes and points of divergence in political philosophy.
- Critiquing Eurocentrism: One of the central goals of comparative political theory is to critique the universalist claims of Western political theory by showing how political concepts vary across cultures.
- Normative Engagement: comparative political theory is not just descriptive but also normative, offering frameworks for evaluating political institutions, practices, and values in a cross-cultural context.

== Methodologies ==
Comparative political theory employs a range of methodologies to achieve its goals:

=== Textual comparison ===
One of the core methods in comparative political theory is the comparative analysis of canonical texts from different traditions. For instance, scholars may compare Confucian writings on ethics and governance with Aristotelian ideas of virtue and politics. Such textual comparisons reveal both shared concerns and distinct cultural interpretations of political concepts like justice, power, and authority.

=== Conceptual history ===
Conceptual history examines how political ideas develop and evolve within different cultural and historical contexts. This method is useful for analyzing how similar concepts—such as liberty, equality, or rights—manifest across various traditions and time periods.

=== Genealogical analysis ===
Genealogical methods trace the historical origins of political concepts to reveal their contingent, culturally specific nature. Inspired by the work of Michel Foucault, genealogical analysis helps comparative political theory scholars deconstruct assumptions of universality and expose hidden power dynamics in political discourse.

=== Fieldwork and ethnography ===
Some comparative political theory scholars use fieldwork to study how political ideas are lived and practiced in non-Western societies. This ethnographic approach provides a more grounded understanding of how political theories are embedded in cultural practices and social institutions.

=== Translation and interpretation ===
Translation plays a critical role in comparative political theory, as many foundational texts are written in non-Western languages. Accurate translation and interpretation are necessary to preserve the nuances of original texts and avoid misrepresentation or oversimplification.

== Debates ==
=== Universalism vs. Particularism ===
One of the central debates in comparative political theory is whether political concepts like justice and human rights are universal or culturally specific. Universalists argue that certain values transcend cultural boundaries, while particularists emphasize the diversity of moral and political systems across societies.

=== Cultural Appropriation and Misrepresentation ===
Comparative political theory scholars are often concerned with the risk of cultural appropriation or the misinterpretation of non-Western ideas. Careful scholarship is required to avoid imposing Western categories onto non-Western traditions or simplifying complex philosophical systems.

=== Hybridity and Syncretism ===
Some comparative political theory thinkers advocate for hybrid or syncretic approaches that blend insights from multiple traditions to create new political frameworks. For example, scholars have explored the potential of combining liberal democratic principles with Confucian ideas of meritocracy and social harmony.

=== Power and Representation ===
Critical comparative political theory scholars examine how global power imbalances shape the production and dissemination of political knowledge. They highlight the need to amplify marginalized voices and challenge the dominance of Western epistemologies in academic discourse.
