= Level bust =

Aviation error

A level bust, also known as an altitude deviation, occurs when an aircraft fails to fly at the level for which it has been cleared. A level bust is defined by EUROCONTROL as: "Any unauthorised vertical deviation of more than 300 feet from an ATC flight clearance."

This may take one of three different forms:

1. An aircraft in level flight climbs or descends without clearance
2. An aircraft climbing or descending fails to level off accurately at the correct level (either passing through and continuing the climb or descent, or passing through and then returning to the correct level)
3. An aircraft levelling off at the correct level or altitude, but with an incorrect altimeter setting

== Causal factors ==
Mis-hear
An ATCO member failed to detect an incorrect readback. Mis hear errors are recorded when an ATCO fails to detect and correct an incorrect pilot R/T read back which is audible. These errors are more common at ATC centres with high R/T workload.
Correct pilot readback followed by incorrect action
The pilot readback the controllers instruction correctly however performed an incorrect action (e.g., climbed to incorrect FL). Some events in this category will involve occasions where crews have received a clearance to a level which is known to cause confusion such as FL100/FL110 or FL200/220. The UK have introduced non-standard R/T phraseology to overcome this difficulty but the problem is still with us; in 2004 there are 8 recorded occasions where a crew have correctly acknowledged a descent clearance to FL110 but have then descended to FL100. Other events will involve a breakdown in cockpit SOPs; It is not fully understood why this type of event occurs but it is possible that high R/T loading, high cockpit workload and communication issues are all contributory factors.
Incorrect pilot readback by correct aircraft
The pilot's readback of the controller instruction was erroneous (e.g., wrong level)
Pilot readback by incorrect aircraft
A pilot read back an instruction that had been issued to another aircraft.
Failed to follow cleared SID
The pilot failed to follow comply with the level restrictions include in a SID. Failed to follow cleared SID is a particular issue with departures from Gatwick, Stansted, and Luton although other airports are affected. Gatwick, Stansted and Luton all have step climb SIDs and these errors normally involve an aircraft failing to stop at the first stop altitude.
Altimeter setting error
The crew did not have the correct pressure set. Altimeter setting error is a problem mainly reported in the London TMA, 80% of the errors occur when the aircraft is in the climb, is above the transition altitude/level and the standard pressure setting isn't set.
Poor manual handling
The pilot's manual flying of the aircraft led to aircraft failing to comply with clearance.
Aircraft technical problem
Technical problems exist with the aircraft
Failure to follow ATC instruction
The pilot did not comply with an ATC instruction (e.g., the aircraft failed to hold when instructed).

== Accidents and serious incidents involving level bust ==
- 12 November 1996, an Il-76 collided in mid air with a Saudi B747 near New Delhi India, following a level bust by the Il-76.
- 12 November 1996, a B737 descended below its assigned holding level in the LHR stack, in IMC, to within 100 feet vertically and between 680 and 820 metres horizontally of an MD-81 at its correct level. Neither aircraft was fitted with ACAS.
- 21 February 2001, a level bust 10 nm north of Oslo by a climbing PIA A310 led to loss of separation with an SAS B736 in which response to a TCAS RA by the A310 not being in accordance with its likely activation(descend). The B736 received and correctly actioned a Climb RA.
- 24 November 2006, an A310 descended significantly below cleared altitude during radar vectored approach positioning, as a result of the flight crew's failure to set the QNH, which was very low.

== See also ==
Level bust awareness e-learning toolkit
