= European Helicopter Safety Team =

- Abbreviation: EHEST
- Merged into: European Safety Promotion Network - Rotorcraft (ESPN-R)
- Formation: 2006
- Dissolved: 2016
- Type: Aviation safety improvement initiatives
- Purpose: Reduce worldwide helicopter accident rate by 80% between 2006 and 2016 (European contribution)
- Parent organization: ESSI, EASA
- Website: ESPN-R, successor

The European Helicopter Safety Team (EHEST) was a European aviation safety improvement initiative focusing on improving helicopter safety in Europe and worldwide. It was established in 2006 as part of the European Strategic Safety Initiative (ESSI) of the European Aviation Safety Agency (EASA). The goal of the European Helicopter Safety Team was to contribute to reducing the worldwide helicopter accident rate by 80% in the time-span 2006-2016, which was set as a goal by the International Helicopter Safety Team (IHST) in 2006. Focusing on European helicopter operators and manufacturers, the European Helicopter Safety Team conducted helicopter accident analyses, provided technology potential studies, and published safety management and training documents.

== Organization ==
European Helicopter Safety Team (EHEST) organization in European and international helicopter safety initiatives

Members of the European Helicopter Safety Team were helicopter manufacturers, regulators, and operators, as well of multiple accident investigation bodies, research organisations, and pilot associations, originating from EASA member states and members of the European Civil Aviation Conference (ECAC).

Within the European Helicopter Safety Team, there were two distinct working groups: the European Helicopter Safety Analysis Team (EHSAT) and the European Helicopter Safety Implementation Team (EHSIT). The European Helicopter Safety Analysis Team published helicopter accident analysis reports, while the European Helicopter Safety Implementation Team aimed to support helicopter operations by providing generalized checklists, manuals, and supplementary safety information, by investigating how technology can contribute to an increase in safety, and by supplying training and educational material. The work of both teams is available in EASA's safety promotion database.

The European Helicopter Safety Team has been closed as of the year 2016. Its work is utilized and continued through the European Safety Promotion Network - Rotorcraft (ESPN-R), within the scope of EASA.

From 2006 until 2016, the European Helicopter Safety Team was the European part of the International Helicopter Safety Team (IHST). In 2019, the International Helicopter Safety Team was renamed the International Helicopter Safety Foundation (IHSF), reflecting its more permanent safety role in the international helicopter operation community. In 2021, the International Helicopter Safety Foundation reorganized under a new charter as the VAST, a public–private initiative intended to coordinate regional vertical-flight safety teams and share safety information internationally. VAST materials describe participation by safety authorities including the FAA. The European Safety Promotion Network - Rotorcraft now coordinates its efforts with the International Helicopter Safety Foundation.

== Accident analysis reports ==
The European Helicopter Safety Analysis Team compiled two accident analysis reports, covering 325 helicopter accidents in the time-frame 2000-2005, and 162 helicopter accidents in the time-frame 2006-2010, respectively. The analyses were conducted by regional teams of Finland, France, Germany, Hungary, Ireland, Italy, the Netherlands, Norway, Spain, Sweden, and the United Kingdom. Accidents were analysed utilizing Standard Problem Statements (SPS) and the Human Factors Analysis and Classification System (HFACS).

Most analysed accidents occurred during general aviation helicopter flights (44%). 30% of accidents occurred during aerial work (for example, trimming flora around power lines with an aerial saw), 22% of accidents during commercial air transport. Only 4% of accidents occurred during non-military state flights. 24% of accidents resulted in fatal injuries, 13% in serious injuries. Minor injuries were reported in 20% of cases, 43% of accidents caused no injuries at all. In most cases (48%), the helicopter was destroyed, in 44% of cases, the sustained damage was substantial. In only 8% of accidents, the aircraft damage was minor or nonexistent. The five largest high-level Standard Problem Statements contributing to accidents are:

- pilot judgment & actions
- safety management
- ground duties
- pilot situation awareness
- data issues

== Technology potential studies ==
The European Helicopter Safety Implementation Team developed the Safety Issues Matrix-tool in order to evaluate the potential of technology to increase safety, based on the accident analysis carried out by the European Helicopter Safety Analysis Team. The analysis followed the assumption that by providing novel and improved technological support in certain operational areas, the identified SPS could be avoided, or their impact on safety lessened. The final report identifies 15 highly promising technologies to increase safety:

- terrain awareness / ground proximity warning system
- digital range image algorithms, to support low-level flight and provide flight guidance
- obstacle and terrain avoidance system (laser radar-based)
- digital map
- voice and flight data recorder (deployable)
- obstacle collision avoidance system (passive, tower-based)
- voice and flight data recorder (miniature)
- wire strike protection system
- evaluation and processing of flight data for accident/incident investigation
- cockpit information recorder (camera, microphone, GPS)
- Full Authority Digital Engine Control (FADEC)
- Helicopter Operations Monitoring Program (HOMP) for light helicopters
- on-board flight performance modelling (through efficient numerical approaches)
- radar altimeter
- immersive visualization to support accident analyses

== Publications for operators ==
=== Safety management system and operations tool-kits ===
The European Helicopter Safety Implementation Team published safety management tool-kits for helicopter operators, as well as tools and checklists for risk-assessment and instructional videos. These documents are intended to support helicopter operators to set up and maintain their own individual safety management systems, tailored to their specific operational profile.

=== Training and educational documents ===
The European Helicopter Safety Implementation Team published several training leaflets and instructional material. Flight instructor guides and manuals are provided, as well as a graphical overview of ground operation signals and instructional videos about decision-making, Degraded Visual Environments (DVE, for example caused by brownout) and loss of control, operating in the vicinity of electric utility infrastructure, and passenger management for pilots and passengers. A template for a pre-flight planning checklist is provided, as well. The training leaflets cover the following common safety-critical areas of helicopter operation:

1. safety considerations
2. helicopter airmanship
3. helicopter off airfield landing sites operations
4. single pilot decision making
5. risk management in training
6. advantages of simulators in helicopter flight training
7. techniques for helicopter operations in hilly or mountainous terrain
8. the principles of threat and error management for helicopter pilots, instructors and training organisations
9. automation and flight path management
10. teaching and testing in Flight Simulation Training Devices (FSTD)
11. training and testing of emergency and abnormal procedures in helicopters
12. helicopter performance
13. weather threat for Visual Meteorological Conditions (VMC) flights

== See also ==
- European Aviation Safety Agency
- Aviation safety improvement initiatives
- Helicopter
