= Hughes Aerospace Corporation =

American air navigation service provider

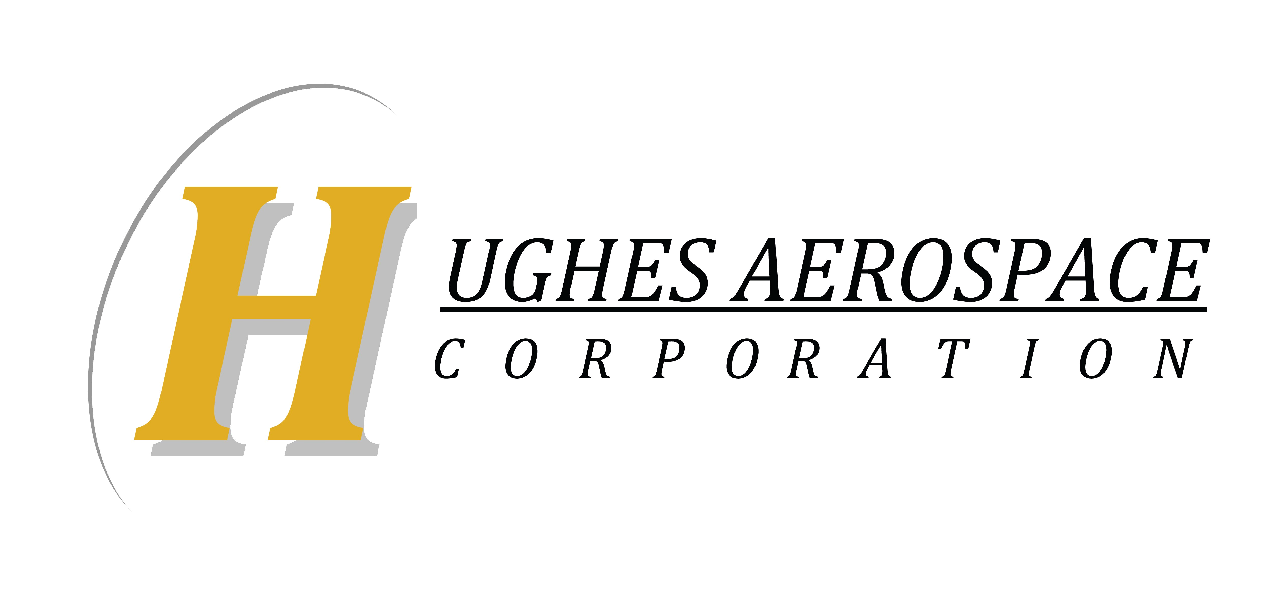
- Type: Private
- Industry: Aviation, Navigation Services
- Founded: 2008
- Founder: Chris Baur
- Headquarters: Houston, Texas, U.S.
- Area served: Worldwide
- Key people: Chris Baur (CEO) Alyce Shingler (COO)
- Services: Instrument flight procedure design, validation, maintenance
- Website: www.hughesaerospace.com

Hughes Aerospace Corporation is an American air navigation service provider that specializes in the design, validation, and maintenance of instrument flight procedures. The company's work includes Performance-based navigation (PBN) and rotorcraft operations.

== History ==
Hughes Aerospace was established in 2008 by Chris Baur, a former pilot with the U.S. Army, U.S. Coast Guard, U.S. Air Force, the US Customs Service and Continental Airlines. The company was created to address growing demand for advanced navigation procedure design and expanded its operations to work with airports, commercial operators, government agencies, military, and international aviation authorities.

Hughes Aerospace is headquartered in Houston, Texas. It holds certification from the Federal Aviation Administration (FAA) as a Part 97 Public Service Provider and is endorsed by the International Civil Aviation Organization (ICAO) and other sovereign nations as an air navigation service provider.

== Regulatory status ==
The FAA has approved Hughes Aerospace as a Part 97 Public Service Provider, authorizing it to develop and maintain public instrument flight procedures in the United States. ICAO endorsement allows the company to provide similar services internationally, including China.

== Operations and services ==
Hughes Aerospace designs and maintains instrument flight procedures, with a focus on PBN and helicopter operations. Services include:

- RNAV, RNP, and GPS-based approaches for fixed-wing and rotary-wing aircraft
- GBAS/GLS Precision Instrument Approaches
- COPTER-specific procedures and low-level IFR routes
- Flight inspection services using company-operated aircraft
- Noise abatement and mitigation procedures, including projects at Naples Airport in Florida
- FAA Airfield Lighting certification, including Visual Glide Slope Indicator (VGSI) / Precision Approach Path Indicator (PAPI) Commissioning & Maintenance.

In 2025, Hughes Aerospace collaborated with Garmin to introduce guided visual approaches that support autopilot-coupled visual procedures for WAAS-equipped aircraft.

In addition to fixed-wing procedures, the company has been involved in extending performance-based navigation concepts to rotorcraft and emerging vertical-lift operations, including satellite-based instrument procedures for heliports and vertiports and development work on guided visual approaches in partnership with avionics manufacturers.

== Projects ==
=== Helicopter PBN development ===
Between 2015 and 2017, Hughes Aerospace worked with Bell Helicopter to develop procedures for helicopter operators in China. In 2019, the company validated an IFR helicopter network using RNP 0.3 and RF segment coding. Hughes lead the FAA's Maryland State Police Project, featuring COPTER PBN Instrument Flight Procedures. This was the first time ARINC 424 Radius-to-Fix (RF) segment coding was used in COPTER Instrument Approaches, Departures and Transitions. It was also the first time Low-Altitude COPTER Airways were designed and demonstrated, by Hughes R66 flight inspection helicopter. The COPTER low altitude airways were predicated on Required Navigation Performance (RNP) 0.3, supported by WAAS/SBAS containment. Working with the FAA, Hughes created the ZK airway nomenclature for the COPTER Routes, enabling participating helicopters to operate at lower altitudes and avoid icing conditions. This led to the FAA Operations Certification H-123 for Rotorcraft Class I navigation.

=== Naples Airport noise mitigation ===
In 2024, the Naples Airport Authority awarded Hughes Aerospace a contract to develop noise mitigation procedures. Aircraft altitudes were increased before descent, with testing beginning in 2025.

Alaska

Hughes has participated in several Navigation Projects, supporting General Aviation (GA) in Alaska. A key and historic GA airport supporting the state's General Aviation network is Merrill Field in Anchorage. Hughes developed and published several GPS Instrument Flight Procedures at Merrill Field that are aligned with its runways. During the closure of Kenai Municipal Airport's main runway, Hughes was commissioned to design, implement and maintain instrument flight procedures to a taxiway, serving as the temporary airport's 6025' runway.

=== Ground Based Augmentation System, (GBAS) / GPS Landing System (GLS) ===
Hughes in partnership with Honeywell developed (5) GLS precision approaches at Shanghai Pudong International Airport that demonstrated both the capabilities of GBAS and RNP. These were the first GLS precision approaches in China and the first successful demonstration of Advanced RNP to a GLS precision final approach.

=== Philippines ===
Following the devastation of Typhoon Haiyan to Leyte Island and Daniel Z Romualdez Airport (RPVA), Hughes designed, implemented and donated the country's first Required Navigation Performance (RNP) Instrument Flight Procedures to the Philippine government. This was in response to the destruction of the airport's radio navigation facility Very High Frequency Omnidirectional Range (VOR), limiting recovery until the new PBN procedures were published by the Civil Aviation Authority of the Philippines in 2016.

=== Myanmar ===
In 2014, Hughes and Honeywell partnered with Myanmar Civil Aviation Authority to implement the first Performance Based Navigation Procedures (PBN) at Myanmar's two busies airports; Yangon International Airport (VYYY) & Mandalay International Airport (VYMD).

=== Oman ===
In collaboration the Oman Civil Aviation Authority and Oman Air, Hughes developed and implemented the first Performance Based Navigation Procedures (PBN) in Oman at Mukhaizna Airport (OOMK) and Khasab Airport (OOKB), situated on the Musandam Peninsula, in the Strait of Hormuz.

=== Seattle Greener Skies ===
Hughes was one of the original participants in the Greener Skies over Seattle project along with Boeing, Alaska Airlines, Port of Seattle, and the FAA. A landmark project at Seattle International Airport (KSEA) demonstrating the environmental and time savings realized with Performance Based Navigation (PBN), utilizing Required Navigation Performance (RNP) Instrument Approaches, Continuous Decent Arrival (CDA) and Optimized Profile Decent (OPD) procedures. The seven-year project concluded in 2015. In June 2023, Hughes designed and implemented new (4) instrument approaches at neighboring Boeing Field/King County International Airport, reducing noise, environmental impacts and pilot controller workload.

=== The HUGHES App ===
To address the complexities of Performance Based Navigation, it's geo-referenced digital charting products, hazards and safety solutions, Hughes developed its own iOS based application. The Hughes App is a no-cost application to serve the helicopter and General Aviation industry, in collaboration with the US Helicopter Safety Team (USHST). In a data-driven approach, the top three leading causes of accidents are Controlled Flight into Terrain (CFIT), Inadvertent IMC (IIMC), Loss of Control-Inflight (LOC-I). The Hughes App address these with a VFR Prediction Tool, links to FAA Weather Cameras, Slackline Search tool and Flight Operations Quality Assurance (FOQA) tool.

== Leadership ==
The company's founder, Chris Baur, is chief executive officer. Baur is an aviator with experience in military, law enforcement, and commercial aviation, including military service with the U.S. Army, U.S. Coast Guard, and U.S. Air Force.

In a 2025 interview, Baur said he began flying helicopters in the U.S. Army in 1983 and later served in the U.S. Coast Guard and the U.S. Air Force (Air National Guard and Reserve). He said that during his Air Force tenure his civilian job included working as a pilot and criminal investigator for the U.S. Customs Service, and that he later became an airline pilot with Continental Airlines. A profile republished by the U.S. Helicopter Safety Team describes him as a Customs pilot assigned to the New York Aviation Unit, and a captain in the New York Air National Guard. It further states he flew a HH-60G Pave Hawk during a December 1994 search-and-rescue mission, following the sinking of the Ukrainian freighter MV Salvador Allende which broke up during a storm in the North Atlantic. The Salvador Allende mission is recognized as one of the longest over-water helicopter rescues in history.

During his tenure with the U.S. Customs Service, Attorney General Janet Reno presented Baur the Federal Law Enforcement Officer's Association (FLEOA) Medal of Valor for heroism. He was also designated a Customs Air Ace 5.

Baur holds degrees from Embry-Riddle Aeronautical University, Brown University, and IE Business School and is a Fellow of the Royal Aeronautical Society.

While in the US Coast Guard, Baur took off from Floyd Bennett Field, piloting an HH65A Dolphin helicopter, in response to US Air flight 5050, which crashed on takeoff from LaGuardia Airport. Baur successfully located the survivors in the water who were swept by the current under the elevated runway.

Since 2023, he has been Industry Co-chair of the U.S. Helicopter Safety Team (USHST), a regional member of The Vertical Aviation Safety Team (VAST). During his tenure, he created the first Peer Pilot Mental Health program for helicopter pilots and crewmembers. In 2025, Baur was elected to the Board of Directors of Vertical Aviation International (VAI), and is vice chairman.
