= Charleston Sofa Super Store fire =

2007 firefighter casualty in South Carolina, US

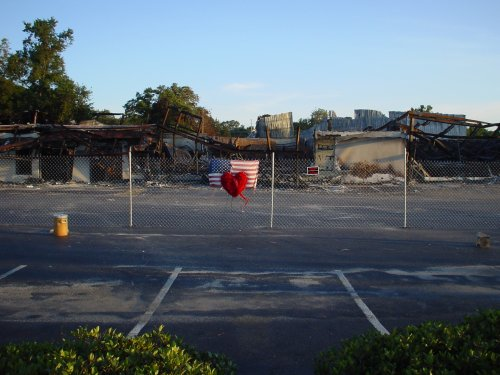
- The center of the Sofa Super Store showroom the day after the fire
- Date: June 18, 2007 – June 19, 2007
- Time: 7:08 p.m. (EDT)
- Location: 1807 Savannah Highway, Charleston, South Carolina, U.S.; 32.787786°N 80.022147°W
- Cause: Unknown, suspected to be from a negligently discarded cigarette
- Deaths: 9
- Injuries: 18
- Property damage: Total loss of building, warped siding of nearby structures from heat

The Charleston Sofa Super Store fire was a firefighting accident that occurred on the evening of June 18, 2007, in Charleston, South Carolina, resulting in the deaths of nine firefighters. It was the deadliest firefighter disaster in the US since the September 11 attacks. The fire, which started in the loading dock of the furniture store, rapidly spread to the main showroom and warehouse, leading to a catastrophic structural collapse. Despite initial firefighting efforts and rescue attempts, the poor water supply and lack of fire sprinkler systems contributed to the incident. The site was cleared after the fire, and a new fire station was constructed nearby.

== Fire and collapse ==
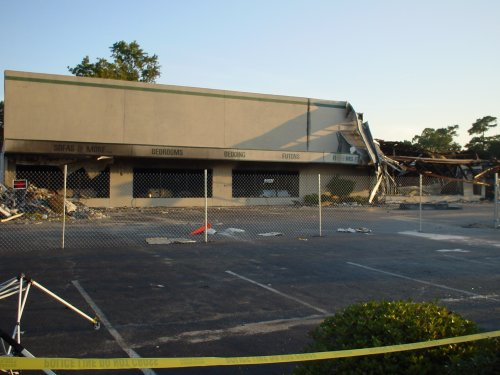
The north end of the showroom the day after the fire

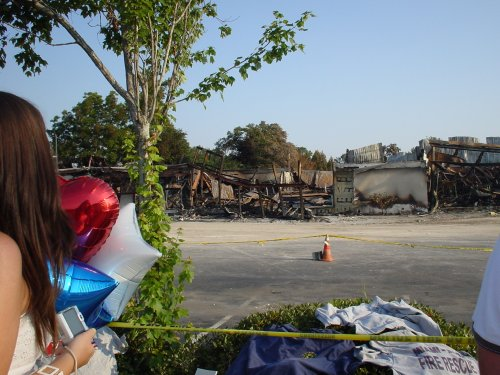
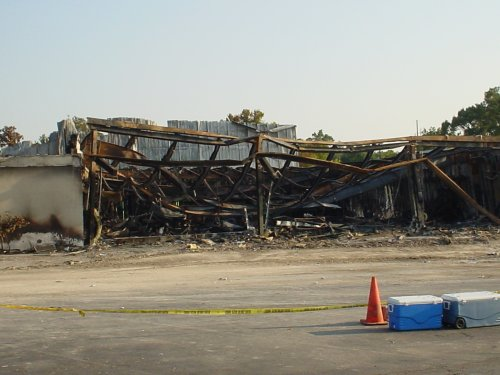
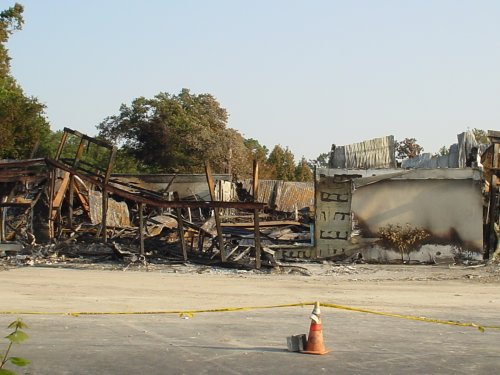
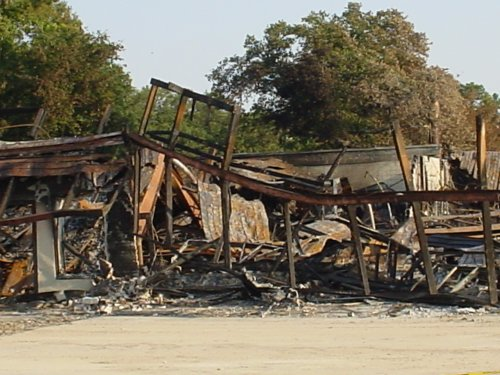
Various views of the south end of the showroom the day after the fire

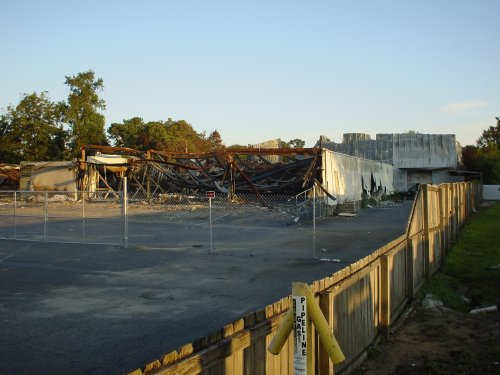
The south end of the showroom, with the warehouse behind it, the day after the fire

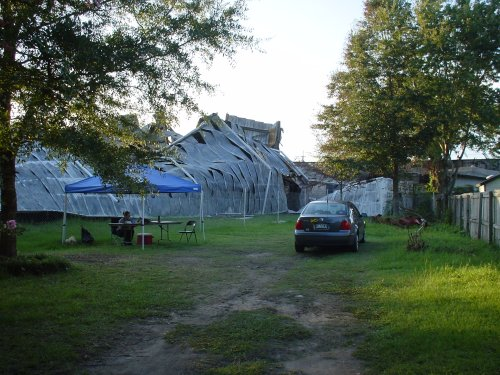
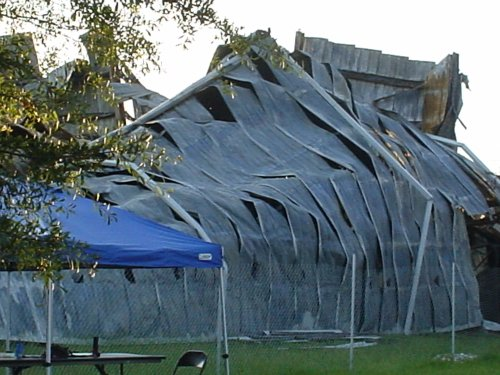
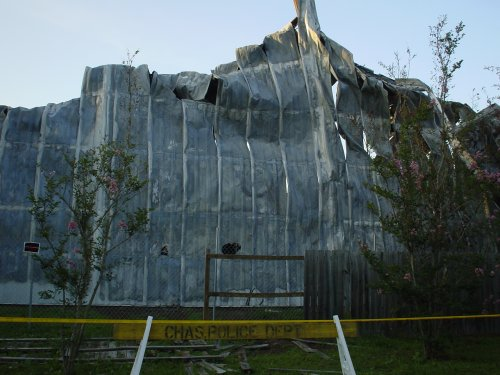
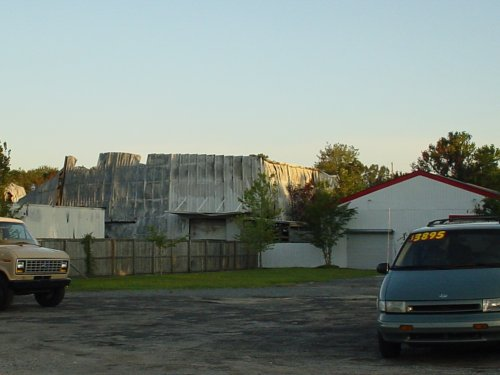
Various views of the warehouse the day after the fire

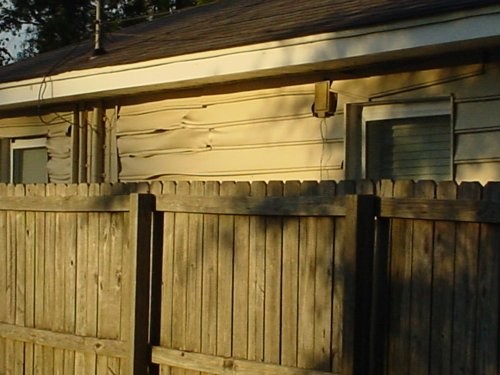
Vinyl siding of a nearby neighbor's house warped from the heat of the fire

The fire occurred at the Sofa Super Store, composed of a 42,000-square-foot (3,900 m^{2}) single-story steel trussed showroom building with a 17,000-square-foot (1,600 m^{2}) warehouse building located behind the retail space, located at 1807 Savannah Highway in Charleston. The building had no fire sprinkler system. Sofa Super Store had set up shop there in 1992. The fire started at approximately 7:00 p.m. in a covered loading dock area built between the showroom and warehouse buildings which was attached to both buildings. At the time, the business was open and employees were present. Charleston firefighters arrived on the scene within three minutes of the alarm, followed soon after by firefighters from the St. Andrews Public Service District.

The initial attack focused on extinguishing the fire in the loading dock area, with a secondary effort to search for and evacuate people inside, and prevent the fire from spreading to the showroom and warehouse. Crews entering the showroom reportedly initially encountered clear visibility with only very light puffs of smoke visible near the ceiling at the back of the showroom. Shortly thereafter, an exterior door was opened near where the fire was raging. Efforts to close the door failed, allowing the fire to enter the showroom. Firefighters were ordered to stretch two hose lines into the showroom to attack the spreading fire; however, the pre-connected hose line from one of the units was too short. This required some firefighters to again exit the building to add additional sections of hose, and left only one small handline to hold back the growing fire. At about this time, fire dispatchers advised the crews on-scene that they had received a 9-1-1 call from an employee who was trapped in the warehouse, which required some firefighters to direct their attention to the rescue. The trapped employee was eventually rescued by firefighters who breached an exterior wall to reach him.

Despite efforts to confine and extinguish the fire, it continued to spread into the structure and ignited furniture in the showroom, growing more quickly than the few operating hose lines could control. Meanwhile, efforts to stretch and begin operating additional hose lines continued. At 7:41 p.m. the showroom area of the store experienced a flashover while at least sixteen firefighters were working inside. The flashover contributed to the rapid deterioration of the structural integrity of the building, leading to a near-complete collapse of the roof minutes later. Many of the firefighters caught in the flashover were unable to escape and were trapped under the collapsed roof and shelving weakened by the fast-spreading fire. Several calls for help were made by trapped firefighters and efforts to rescue them were commenced. These efforts proved unsuccessful. By the time the fire was brought under control, nine Charleston firefighters had been killed.

The Sofa Super Store site was on a major business and commuter artery feeding the suburbs and shopping centers of Charleston. Car traffic continued unabated for many critical minutes in the initial stages of the fire, driving over water supply lines and contributing to severe water supply problems, as the supply lines snaked from hydrants in surrounding blocks up to one-half mile (0.8 km) away from the center of the fire. Eventually automobile traffic on Savannah Highway was stopped so water pressure would be more consistent, the traffic diversion causing surrounding neighborhoods to fill with stranded commuters and onlookers. As the fire diminished and appeared contained, nearing 11:00 p.m., surrounding neighborhoods began to clear and onlookers departed, most unaware of the loss of life during the blaze.

According to Charleston County Coroner Rae Wooten, the firefighters died of a combination of smoke inhalation and burns, but not from injuries sustained from the collapse itself. It was the greatest single loss of firefighters in the United States since 343 firefighters were killed in the collapse of the World Trade Center in the September 11, 2001 attacks. It was also the deadliest fire in South Carolina since a fire that killed eleven people at the Lancaster County jail in 1979.

=== Timeline ===
- 7:08 p.m.: First call reporting the fire is received.
- 7:09 p.m.: Dispatched units: Charleston Fire Department Engine 10, Engine 11, Ladder 5 and Battalion 4.
- 7:10 p.m.: Battalion 4 arrives on scene. Dispatched units: Charleston Fire Department Engine 16 and Car 2.
- 7:11 p.m.: Engine 11 arrives first and reports a trash and debris fire that is up against the wall in the loading dock area, but that they have not yet entered the building to check for extension. Engine 10 and Car 2 arrive.
- 7:12 p.m.: Ladder 5 arrives. Engine 12 is dispatched.
- 7:13 p.m.: Engine 15 is dispatched. (approximate) Fire crews enter the showroom building and find no obvious fire; however, some light smoke is visible near the ceiling tiles near where the fire burns outside. A door leading from the showroom to the loading dock area is opened by the Incident Commander, and the force of the fire pulls the door out of his hand. The inrush of oxygen feeds the fire and makes it impossible to close the door. Fire enters the showroom.
- 7:14 p.m.: The Incident Commander reports fire in the showroom.
- 7:15 p.m.: Engine 16 arrives and enters the showroom to join Ladder 5's crew attacking the fire from inside. Engine 19 is dispatched.
- 7:16 p.m.: Charleston Fire Chief Rusty Thomas (Car 1) arrives, several off-duty firefighters also begin to arrive. Engine 6 is dispatched. Inadequate water supply begins to be a problem, which is compounded by some hoses being run over by passing vehicles.
- 7:17 p.m.: Engine 12 and Engine 15 arrive.
- 7:20 p.m.: Engine 19 arrives. Problems continue with the water supply.
- 7:21 p.m.: Engine 6 arrives.
- 7:24 p.m.: Battalion 5 arrives. St. Andrew Car 3 (from neighboring St. Andrews Public Service District) decided on their own to respond and soon request more help from St. Andrews crews.
- 7:25 p.m.: St. Andrews Engine 2 and St. Andrews Rescue 1 arrive.
- 7:26 p.m.: An employee of the Sofa Super Store calls 911 and reports that he is trapped in the warehouse building. The crew from St. Andrews is notified of the trapped employee and attempts to locate him from the outside.
- 7:29 p.m. (approximate): The trapped employee is rescued when the St. Andrews firefighters breach an exterior wall and pull him out of the building.
- 7:31 p.m.: The first firefighters in the building have been breathing from their air bottles for approximately eighteen minutes and will soon run out of air. Conditions in the showroom continue to worsen while at least sixteen firefighters continue to work inside. Engine 3 is dispatched.
- 7:32 p.m.: A firefighter inside calls "Mayday!" over his radio. Soon after, another voice on the radio is heard to say "Car One (Chief Thomas). Please tell my wife that ... 'I love you.'" Another firefighter inside is heard on the radio saying "...in Jesus's name, amen." Chief Thomas orders his commanders to account for their crews and is told that some firefighters remain inside. One firefighter attempting to escape is trapped behind the large glass in front of the showroom, and is freed when someone smashes it as other crews prepare to enter the building to rescue firefighters in distress. An emergency alert is activated on the radio of Ladder 5's engineer, who is inside, but calls to that radio go unanswered. Several PASS devices worn by firefighters are heard, meaning that firefighters in distress have manually activated them or have been motionless for at least 30 seconds. Firefighters begin smashing all of the glass in front of the store to allow escaping firefighters out and rescuing firefighters in, but this allows large amounts of oxygen to reach the fire, which quickly begins to grow in intensity.
- 7:38 p.m.: Chief Thomas orders a full evacuation.
- 7:40 p.m.: Engine 3 arrives.
- 7:41 p.m. (approximate): A flashover occurs. Virtually all of the interior of the showroom building erupts in fire within seconds. Chaotic radio traffic now ties up the radio channels, but calls about water supply problems continue. A final, unsuccessful attempt at rescue is made but quickly forced back by the intensity of the fire.
- 7:45 p.m.: The front of the showroom building collapses, sending a fireball and smoke plume out the front of the building, over the heads of fleeing firefighters and showering hundreds of onlookers with ash and debris. Fire then shoots 30 feet (9 m) into the air as much of the rest of the structure collapses.
- 10:00 p.m. (approximate): After the fire is brought under control, the remains of two of the firefighters' bodies are found near the center of the building.
- 10:45 p.m. (approximate): Charleston Mayor Joe Riley announces that several firefighters remain missing.
- 11:00 p.m. (approximate): The bodies of two more firefighters are located about 30 feet (9 m) from the first group.
- 11:15 p.m. (approximate): Three firefighters' bodies are found at the south end of the building.
- 4:00 a.m. (approximate): The remaining two missing firefighters are located at the northeast corner of the building.

=== Fallen ===
Company	Rank	Name	Age	Years of service
Engine 15	Captain	Louis Mulkey	34	11 1/2 years
Engine 16	Captain	Mike Benke	49	30 years
Engine 16	Firefighter	Melvin Champaign	46	2 years
Engine 19	Captain	William "Billy" Hutchinson	48	30 years
Engine 19	Engineer	Bradford "Brad" Baity	37	9 years
Engine 19	Firefighter	James "Earl" Drayton	56	32 years
Ladder 5	Engineer	Mark Kelsey	40	12 1/2 years
Ladder 5	Engineer	Michael French	27	1 1/2 years
Ladder 5	Firefighter	Brandon Thompson	27	4 years

== Investigations ==
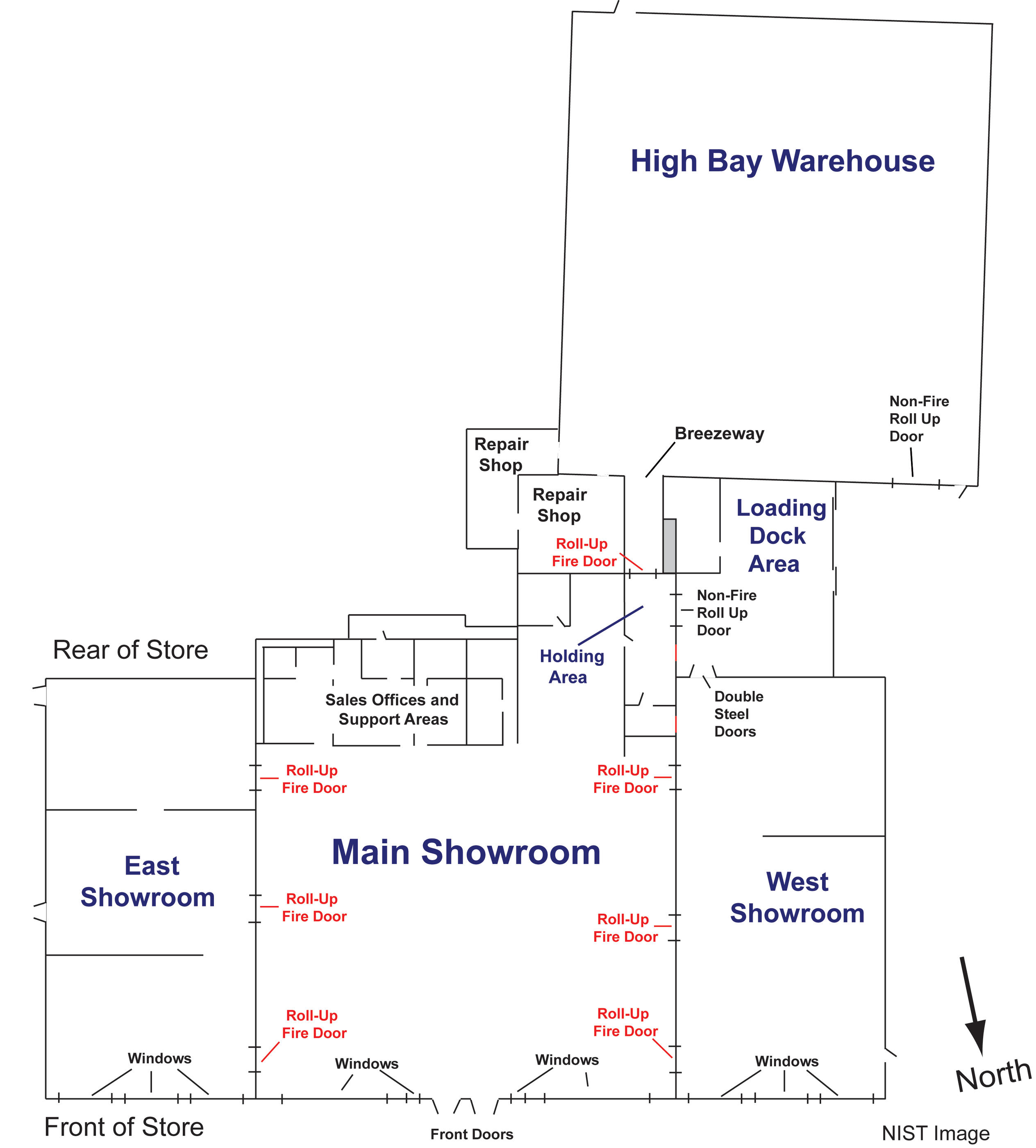
Floor plan of the Charleston Sofa Super Store

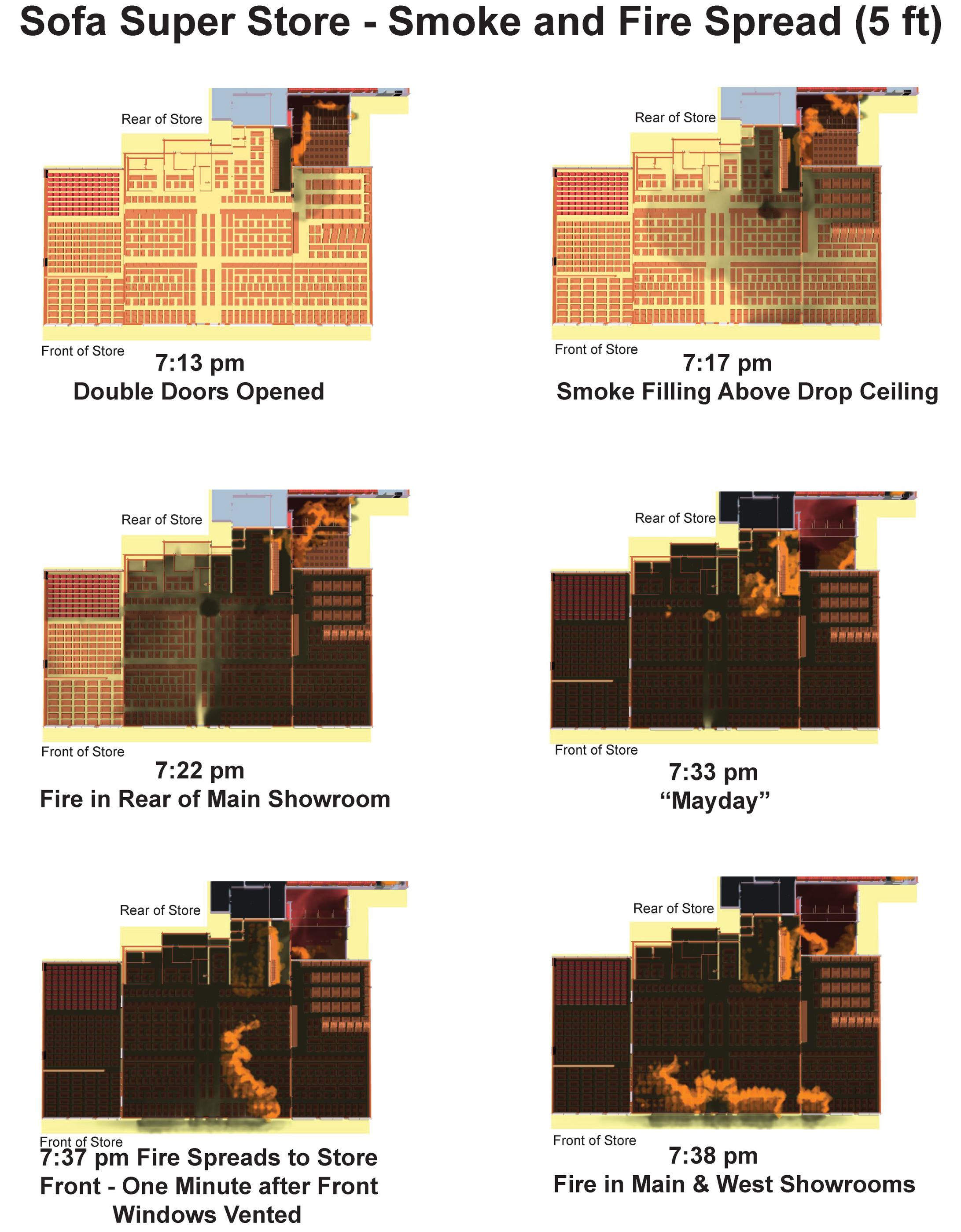
Map of smoke and fire movement at six critical points prepared by NIST

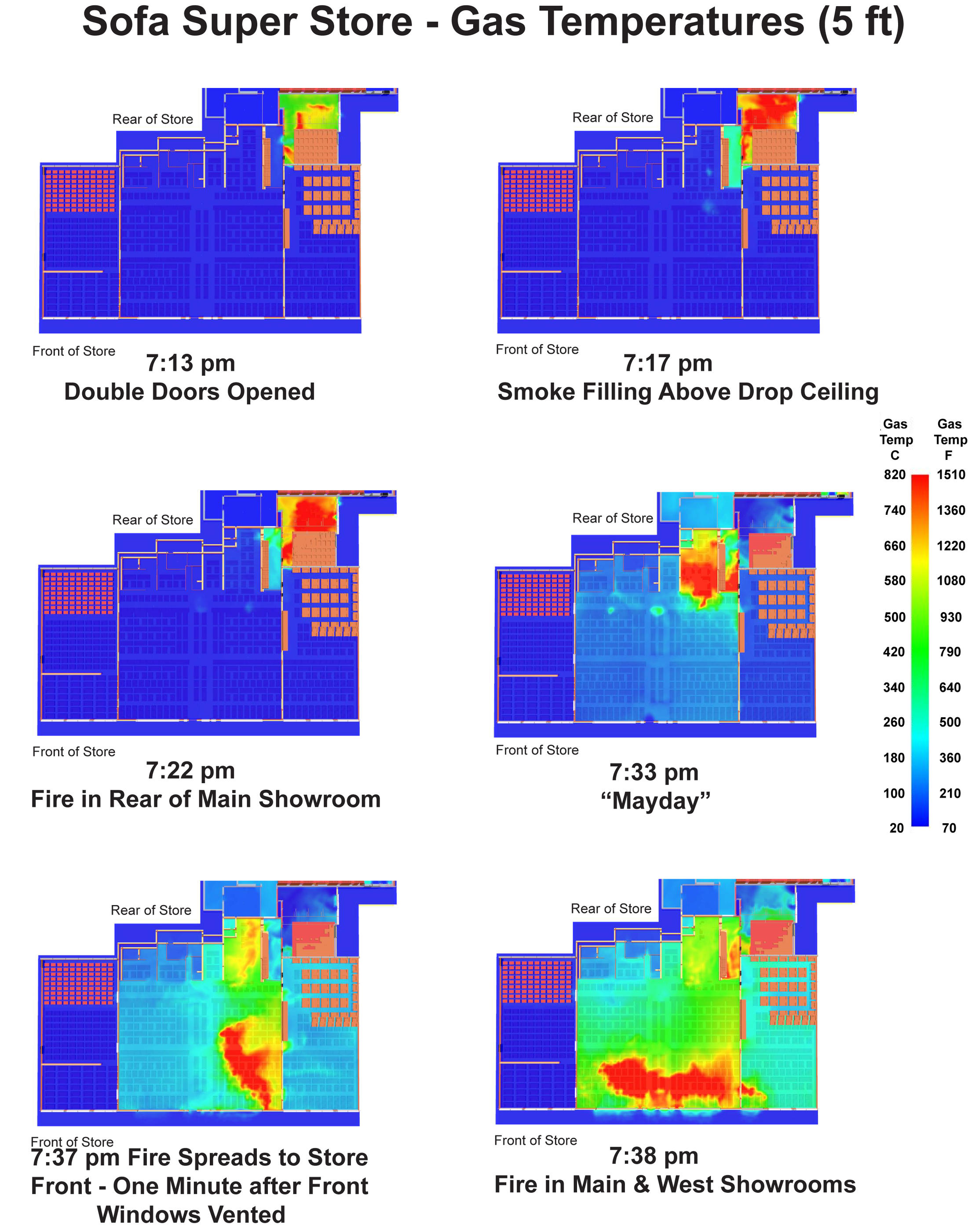
Map of gas temperatures at six critical points prepared by NIST

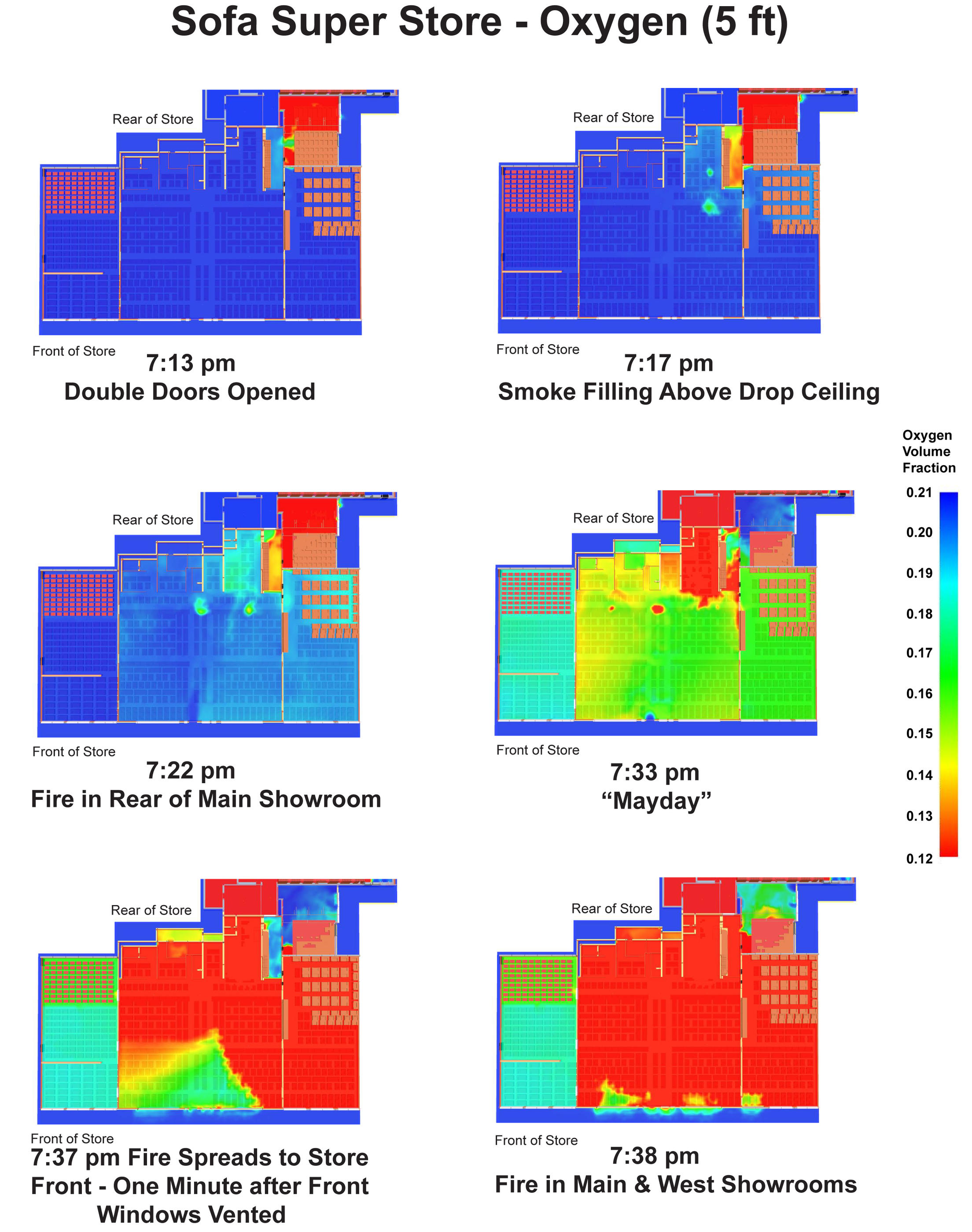
Map of oxygen levels movement at six critical points prepared by NIST

About fifty investigators in all were assigned to the investigation, including the City of Charleston Police Department, the Charleston County Sheriff's Office, the South Carolina State Law Enforcement Division, and the ATF national response team. The ATF confirmed on June 23 that the fire originated in the covered loading dock area situated between the showroom and warehouse buildings, in a pile of trash near an area where employees were known to take smoking breaks. Neither of the destroyed buildings had sprinklers, nor were they required by local codes to have them.

The South Carolina Department of Labor, Licensing and Regulation investigated the Charleston Fire Department's procedures and training in light of the deaths. The National Institute for Occupational Safety and Health (NIOSH), as always when a firefighter line-of-duty-death occurs, conducted an independent investigation of the incident. The National Institute of Standards and Technology (NIST) assisted NIOSH by reconstructing the fire with a computer simulation.

On Monday, July 2, 2007, Chief Rusty Thomas told the CDC (which oversees NIOSH, the federal department that investigates firefighter fatalities) that his department would not allow federal investigators to interview firefighters about the Sofa Super Store fire. On Tuesday, July 3, 2007, the head of NIOSH wrote to Chief Thomas, asking him to reconsider. On Thursday, July 5, 2007, the city relented when Mayor Joe Riley called the CDC to say that interviews would be allowed. CDC spokesman Fred Blosser, in an interview with MSNBC, said, "This is a developing situation. This morning we were notified that the chief has said that he will grant access to the firefighters. Earlier this week, he had indicated that he was denying access to the firefighters for interviews." Mayor Riley replied that it was all a misunderstanding. He said that Chief Thomas was merely trying to minimize the number of interviews of his weary and grieving firefighters, not to block any investigation.

The U.S. Fire Administration also investigated the fire, to incorporate lessons into the curriculum at the National Fire Academy.

=== Charleston panel ===
A panel of outside experts was convened by the City of Charleston to examine the city's fire department and its handling of the fire. The panel included Gordon Routley, Kevin Roche, Tim Sendelbach, Brian Crawford, Mike Chiramonte, and Pete Piringer. Mayor Joe Riley stated that the panel's work was divided into three parts. The team's first step was to conduct an "intense diagnostic analysis" of the fire department and its practices and procedures. The mayor indicated this phase would only take about a month, and any recommendations will be acted on immediately. The second step would compile reports from local, state, and federal investigators into one report the city could work from, to last approximately four months. The last step was to create a long-term strategic plan to chart a future course for the city's fire department.

Brian Crawford, in an interview with KTBS-TV News, said, "That report is going to lend so much information to other fire departments across the country who may be operating the same way that Charleston was. It may have them step back and look at their own organizations."

The six-person panel came out with a list of initial recommendations in less than a week. Speaking of the recommended changes, Gordon Routley said, "I think there are areas that are significant firefighter safety issues that, to us, need to be implemented as soon as possible."

The initial changes recommended by the panel include:

- Establishing a Deputy Chief/Assistant to the Chief position
- Establishing a Fire Department Safety Officer position
- Establishing a Public Information Officer
- Having a minimum of two dispatchers on duty at all times
- Maintaining a minimum staffing of three on-duty firefighters at all times on all existing engine and ladder companies
- An incremental movement over two years to achieve four on-duty firefighters on all fire companies
- Applying appropriate incident command procedures on all incidents
- Reinforcing appropriate use of personal protective clothing and SCBA
- Reinforcing the use of seat belts and standard emergency response vehicular operations
- Ensuring that "2-in/2-out" is followed at all times
- Developing management procedures for off-duty firefighters that respond to emergencies
- Implementing Incident Command and tactical operations training for all officers
- Providing training for firefighter safety and survival, risk management, air management, lost/disoriented firefighters, rapid intervention operations, objective-based tactical operations, and other critical firefighter safety procedures
- Providing incident safety officer training for all command officers and health and safety officer training to selected personnel
- Assuring that all new firefighters are trained and certified to the Firefighter II level before assignment to emergency duty, with South Carolina Fire Academy support
- Increasing the initial response to a structure fire to three engines and a ladder, with the third engine as the Rapid Intervention Team (RIT)
- Responding the Assistant Chief, a second Battalion Chief, a fourth engine company, and an ambulance to a confirmed working structure fire
- Utilizing the second-arriving Battalion Chief as the Safety Officer unless a staff Safety Officer is already on scene
- Eliminating 10-codes and using designated tactical channels for major incidents
- Changing to large-diameter supply hose
- Using a minimum of 1½" hose for fire attack and standardizing nozzle configurations

The full report of the investigation, published in 2008, identified many factors that contributed to the tragedy and provided recommendations, including those listed above. The most prominent factor identified in the analysis was the "failure to manage the incident according to accepted practices." This included the lack of a structured incident command system, which led to chaotic communication, the use of smaller hose lines, which did not adequately protect the firefighters or stop the fire, and the heavy use of aggressive offensive attack strategies, which may not have been appropriate in this case. Essentially, they found the Charleston Fire Department "was inadequately staffed, inadequately trained, insufficiently equipped, and organizationally unprepared to conduct an operation of this complexity in a large commercial occupancy," and concluded that the strategies the department had used in the past were ineffective in the Sofa Super Store fire and exposed firefighters to unnecessary risk. Ultimately, "The final analysis of this incident does not suggest that any of the firefighters who lost their lives, or any of the surviving members of the Charleston Fire Department, failed to perform their duties as they had been trained or as expected by their organization. The analysis indicates that the Charleston Fire Department failed to adequately prepare its members for the situation they encountered at the Sofa Super Store Fire."

=== SLED inquiry ===
In early 2010, Charleston area solicitor Scarlett Wilson requested a South Carolina Law Enforcement Division (SLED) inquiry into the fire to determine if criminal charges should be pursued. After an initial inquiry, SLED returned a statement that the fire "does not meet the criteria for a SLED criminal investigation."

== Criticism ==
The City of Charleston refused help from the International Association of Fire Fighters (IAFF) and International Association of Fire Chiefs (IAFC) in planning the memorial, which exacerbated tensions between the IAFF and South Carolina Firefighters' Association (SCFA). The IAFF's General President Harold A. Schaitberger charged that Mayor Joseph Riley and Fire Chief Rusty Thomas are not "labor friendly" and that Charleston is an "openly anti-union city".

The International Association of Fire Fighters (IAFF) and other fire safety experts, including Roger L. Yow, president of the Charleston Firefighters Association and a former captain with 25 years of service in the department, were critical of the manner in which the fire was handled. Union officials and other fire safety experts claimed the City of Charleston Fire Department did not follow procedures consistent with the National Incident Management System. South Carolina governor Mark Sanford directed all state and local emergency response agencies to adopt the system in 2005. Acting state fire marshal John Reich said the state does not inspect the operating procedures of fire departments, but they assume that departments are following guidelines prescribed in the National Incident Management System. Some fire safety experts also questioned why so many firefighters were in a burning building with a steel truss roof, which is known to be a serious safety hazard for firefighters. A routine fire preplan of the structure in June 2006 made no mention of its roof construction, and it has been suggested that CFD firefighters did not pull the ceiling to check for extension into the roof structure.

In a telephone interview with The Charlotte Observer, Charleston Mayor Joe Riley responded to critics by saying, "I have absolute confidence in our procedures and in the leadership."

Chief Thomas and some firefighters with the City of Charleston dismissed critics as outsiders who did not understand the realities of fighting fires in a dense city full of historic buildings. However, the fire occurred in a suburban district, miles from the historic downtown, where the main exposures were one-story ranch houses. The Post and Courier quoted Chief Thomas as saying, "Our firefighting techniques are not going to change in the City of Charleston Fire Department [...] We're safe, we've got the best equipment, we've got the best people and that's the way we fight fires." Chief Thomas indicated that his men performed just as they were trained, and he would not do anything differently if the same fire happened again. Greg Hambrick, reporting for the Charleston City Paper, questioned the chief's reply. "It was an odd response considering a very hush-hush investigation is ongoing and Riley had said several times since the fire that lessons would be learned. Considering nine guys walked into the fire and didn't come out, there must be something that could protect our firefighters next time." Charleston mayoral candidate Dudley Gregorie, referring to the incident, said, "To keep doing things the same way, and expecting different results, is insanity."

Some fire experts questioned why the exterior front windows were taken out by firefighters while crews were committed inside, an action that could have increased the amount of oxygen being fed to the fire and drawn flames to the front of the store. Assistant Fire Chief Larry Garvin stated that fire blew out the windows, at which time firefighters broke open more windows to allow firefighters to escape.

Questions were also raised about the Charleston Fire Department's use of booster lines to fight the fire. Booster lines are only 1 inch (25 mm) in diameter, and deliver only 30 to 60 US gallons (110 to 230 L; 25 to 50 imp gal) of water per minute, much less than a standard 1.75-inch (44 mm) attack line, which delivers up to 150 US gallons (570 L; 120 imp gal) of water per minute, approximately 150% more than a booster line. The smaller booster lines are less effective against very large fires, and offer less protection to firefighters when flames get out of control. Chief Thomas said that he did not know who pulled the booster lines that could be seen in photographs and videos of the fire, but he doubted that they extended more than 15 feet (5 m) inside the structure, and he insisted none were used to fight the fire inside.

Analysis of photographs and video also raised concerns about firefighters, including chief officers, who were not utilizing personal protective equipment appropriately. Some firefighters were wearing street clothes, while others had open coats or were missing helmets. Some firefighters could be seen walking through toxic smoke without air packs. Fire Chief Rusty Thomas indicated that everyone inside the structure, including the nine fallen firefighters, were wearing the appropriate protective equipment.

Although thermal imaging cameras were available on the scene, they were not used in the scene size-up or to help find victims.

Under criticism over the handling of the fire, Chief Rusty Thomas retired roughly a year later, on June 27, 2008.

== Memorials ==
Memorial placed along the sidewalk in front of the Sofa Super Store the day after the fire

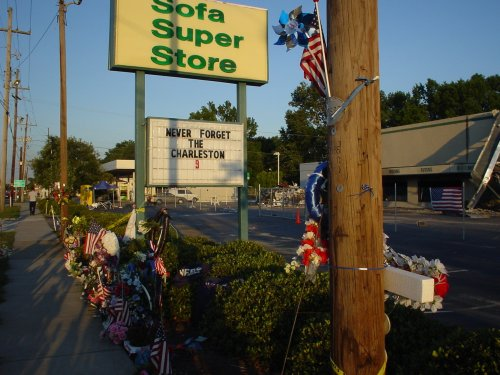
The Sofa Super Store sign (south side)

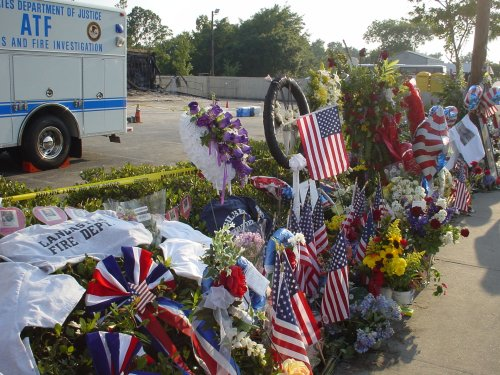
Flags, photos, flowers, and wreaths

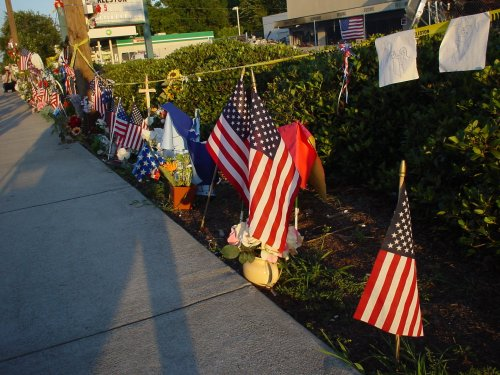
Flags (there are many groupings of nine flags)

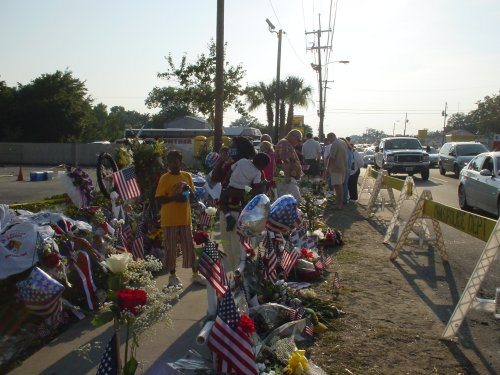
People viewing the memorials

A public memorial service for the fallen firefighters took place on Friday, June 22, 2007, at the North Charleston Coliseum in North Charleston. A procession of more than 300 fire engines, ladder trucks, ambulances, and command vehicles which stretched approximately 7.5 miles (12.1 km) long moved single file along a route which passed each of the three fire stations from which firefighters were lost as well as past the site of the fatal fire, while some bystanders, police officers, and ATF agents paid their respects by saluting or holding their hands over their hearts. The procession then moved along Interstate 526 to the North Charleston Coliseum. An estimated 30,000 people, including as many as 8,000 firefighters representing over 700 emergency services agencies from around the country attended the gathering.

The largest of several funds established for the families of the fallen firefighters raised nearly $1.2 million to benefit the families of the fallen firefighters. This figure does not include an additional $100,000 donated by the Leary Firefighters Foundation, nor several other funds established since the incident. In addition, Sofa Super Store owner Herb Goldstein established the Charleston Nine Scholarship Endowment with a startup donation of $100,000, which will help defray the costs of college tuition for first responders and to children or dependents of both first responders currently serving and those who have lost their lives in the line of duty. Other shops and businesses around the city also accepted donations or contributed a portion of their sales towards the families of the fallen firefighters.

Numerous firefighters from the area accepted an offer from a local tattoo parlor, which employed a St. Andrews firefighter who escaped the collapse, to receive a free tattoo memorializing the lost Charleston firefighters. Firefighters were invited to choose from several memorial designs created specifically as remembrances of the lost firefighters.

Mayor Joe Riley announced on June 27, 2007, that the City of Charleston had reached a tentative agreement with Sofa Super Store owner Herb Goldstein to turn the site of the tragedy into a park with a memorial for the nine fallen firefighters. The memorial consists of a park as large as the former sofa store opposite the nearby fire station with plaques dedicated to the fallen firefighters placed where they fell.

The following day, Riley proposed a second memorial be included in a planned, but controversial, county park. "It could be where every firefighter in the region goes for their picnic," Riley said. The second memorial has been criticized as a move to garner support for the county park project.

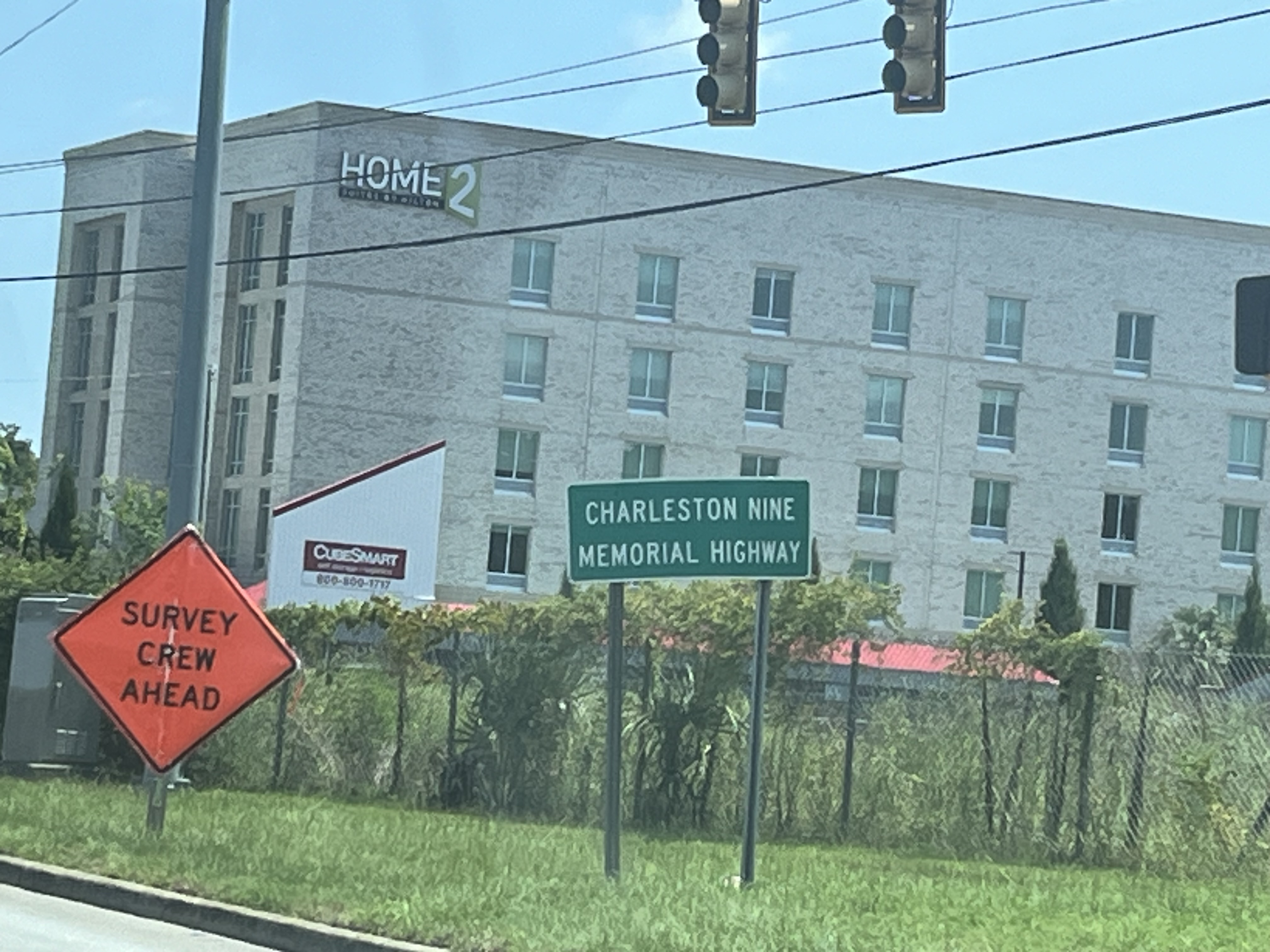
Charleston Nine Memorial Highway designated sign

On March 25, 2008, it was announced that South Carolina state lawmakers had approved a bill to name a 3.6 mile stretch of U.S. Route 17 in honor of the fallen Charleston firefighters. The designated section, to be named the "Charleston Nine Memorial Highway", runs from the intersection with S.C. Highway 171 to Sam Rittenberg Boulevard and includes the site of the fire.

The Summerville High School basketball team, of which Captain Louis Mulkey was an assistant coach, was presented with a custom memorial fire helmet by the Charleston Fire Department. The team placed the helmet on the bench for each of the team's games in the 2007–08 season. Summerville went on to win its first-ever state basketball championship.

In 2008, the Coastal Carolina Council of the Boy Scouts of America sold a patch that commemorated the Charleston Nine.

Memorials are held annually in Charleston on the anniversary of the fire.

== Reactions ==
Nine brave, heroic, courageous firefighters of the city of Charleston have perished fighting fire in a most courageous and fearless manner, carrying out their duties. To all of their loved ones, our heart goes out to them [...] This is a tragic event for our community, the magnitude of which is difficult to fathom or quantify.

— City of Charleston Mayor Joseph P. Riley Jr.

What happened in Charleston last night is an all too tragic reminder of the danger faced by firefighters and other men and women in uniform as they put themselves in harm's way each and every day to keep the rest of us safe. These are truly some of South Carolina's bravest, who in this case made the ultimate sacrifice in the line of duty. I'd ask each and every South Carolinian to join me, Jenny and the boys in keeping these nine families in our thoughts and prayers in the difficult weeks and months ahead.

— South Carolina Governor Mark Sanford

Last night 9 brave firefighters from my district lost their lives in the line of duty. Responding to a fire in the West Ashley area of Charleston, these men made the ultimate sacrifice in service to our community in what was the single worse loss of firefighters since 9/11. This tragedy is a somber reminder of the dangers our first responders face on a daily basis as they serve to protect us and our property. We are forever grateful for their service and deeply saddened by their loss. These men, who had over 100 years of service among them, gave their life doing a job they loved.

— South Carolina Congressman Henry Brown

Not since 9/11 have we been reminded so poignantly of the sacrifice our first responders make to protect our safety. These nine firefighters gave the ultimate sacrifice last night doing the jobs they loved. As Charlestonians, South Carolinians and Americans, we are grateful for their service and deeply saddened by their loss. Our hearts go out to their families and their colleagues. This devastating loss is one that touched the hearts of our entire nation, and we grieve with them. Dr. Martin Luther King once said, 'Everybody can be great because anybody can serve...You only need a heart full of grace. A soul generated by love. And you can be that servant.' These firefighters were public servants in the truest sense. They answered the call to serve their community, and today Charleston is a better place for their service. Between the nine that perished was a combined 100 years of service to the Charleston fire department. This is a remarkable testament to their dedication and selflessness. Their experience and service cannot be replaced and their contributions will not be forgotten.

— South Carolina Congressman James Clyburn

Laura and I mourn the devastating loss of some of America's Bravest. Our prayers are with the families and friends of nine firefighters from Charleston, South Carolina, who selflessly gave their own lives to protect their community. These firefighters were true heroes who demonstrated great skill and courage. Their unwavering commitment to their neighbors and to the City of Charleston is an inspiration to all Americans.

— U.S. President George W. Bush

On Monday, June 18, 2007, the city of Charleston sustained a tragedy of unspeakable proportion. There are no words to express our sorrow. All of us at Sofa Super Store are devastated and heartbroken by this tragedy. Our thoughts and prayers go out to the families of the heroic firefighters who lost their lives.

— The Sofa Super Store's website's homepage weeks after the fire

== See also ==
- Fire Fighter Fatality Investigation and Prevention Program
- Leary Firefighters Foundation
- National Fire Fighter Near-Miss Reporting System
