= Losa =

Losa may refer to:

== People ==
- Alberto Losa (born 1917), Swiss football player
- Brad De Losa (born 1979), Australian fitter
- Gastón Losa
- Ilse Losa (1913—2006), Portuguese writer and translator
- Isabella Losa
- Pedro Martínez Losa (born 1976), Spanish football manager

== Places ==
- La Losa, Spain
- Losa del Obispo, Spain
- Nuraghe Losa, Italy
- Valle de Losa, Spain

== Other ==
- LOSA Collaborative
