= IATA Accident Classification Task Force =

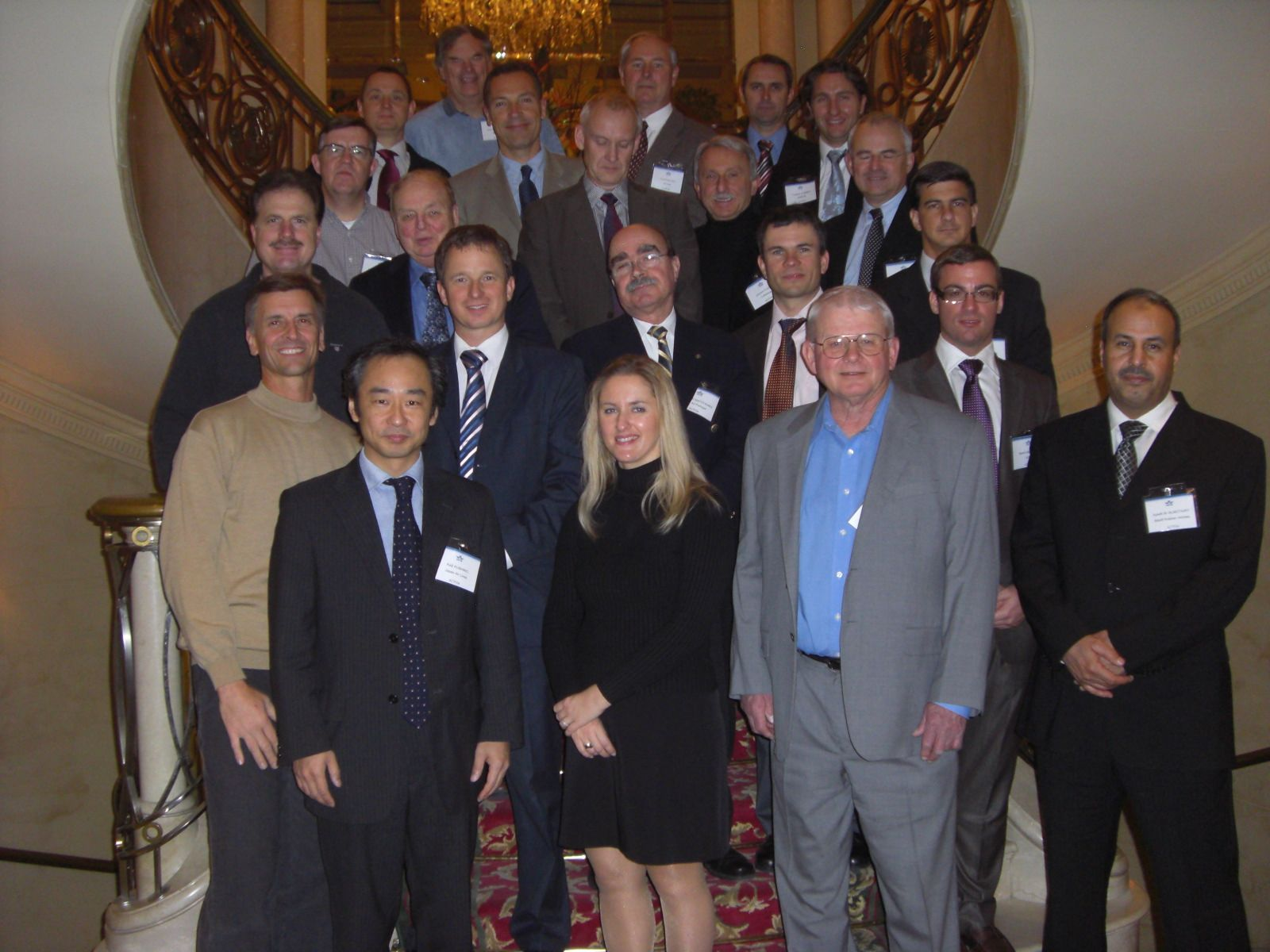
The ACTF in 2009

The IATA Accident Classification Task Force (ACTF) analyses and classifies commercial aviation accidents for jet aircraft with a maximum takeoff weight of more than 20 tons and for turboprops of more than 5,7 tons (metric). The task force holds its annual meeting typically early in January to discuss, analyse and classify the accidents of the previous year. A special Accident Classification system based on a Threat and Error Management Framework is applied. The task force comes up with recommendations to enhance safety of air transportation. The outcomes, including statistical data, correlations and accident causations are published in the annual IATA Safety Report.

The group consists of safety experts from airlines from different regions of the world, aircraft and equipment manufacturers, air navigation service providers, pilot unions and air navigation chart providers. The variety in expertise and by region ensures that many aspects of an accident are covered.

Membership is by invitation.

== Previous meeting locations ==
- 2006 Geneva
- 2007 Vienna
- 2008 Lisbon
- 2009 Vienna

== Chairperson ==
- Dr. Dieter Reisinger, MSc (Chair)
- Martin Maurino (Safety Advisor)

== See also ==
- Accident classification
