= LOSA Collaborative =

Airline safety organization

The LOSA Collaborative
- Company type: Privately held company
- Industry: Aviation
- Founded: 2001; 24 years ago
- Founder: Dr. James Klinect
- Headquarters: Austin, Texas USA
- Website: www.losacollaborative.com

The LOSA Collaborative is a private organization that serves as the main provider of the Line Operation Safety Audit (LOSA). It was established in 2001 in Austin, Texas to expand the use of the LOSA and sharing of airline safety data in coordination with protocols provided by the International Civil Aviation Organization (ICAO) and the Federal Aviation Administration (FAA).

== Goals ==
The LOSA Collaborative helps airlines conduct a safety audit of their normal flight operations using data models from previous LOSAs. This includes providing support services such as observer training, calibration, data collection software, data analysis and summarizing the LOSA into a report. This data is also shared with members of the industry in research papers and articles authored by members of the organization.

== Founders ==
James Klinect founded The LOSA Collaborative. He was the lead doctoral candidate under Robert Helmreich at The University of Texas Human Factors Research Project (UTHF) where they developed the LOSA methodology and performed the first LOSA for Continental Airlines in 2000.

== Associations ==
During the early 2000s, The LOSA Collaborative provided data to The University of Texas Human Factors Research Project, which was closed in 2007.

== See also ==
- Accident classification
- Aviation safety
- Crew resource management
- Pilot error
- Error management theory
- Threat and error management
