= Charleston nine =

Charleston nine may refer to:

- Charleston Sofa Super Store fire, on June 18, 2007, at Charleston Sofa Super Store
- Charleston church shooting, on June 17, 2015, at Emanuel African Methodist Episcopal Church
