= Air Accident Investigation Bureau (Malaysia) =

Government agency based in Malaysia

Air Accident Investigation Bureau (AAIB)
- Biro Siasatan Kemalangan Udara (BSKU) 航空事故调查局

Agency overview
- Formed: December 14, 2011; 14 years ago
- Type: Aviation Accident Investigation
- Jurisdiction: Government of Malaysia
- Status: Active
- Headquarters: No. 26, Jalan Tun Hussein, Precinct 4, 62100 WP Putrajaya; 2.9127°N 101.68434°E
- Agency executive: Brig Gen Tan Chee Kee RMAF, Chief Air Accident Inspector
- Parent Ministry: Ministry of Transport
- Key document: Memorandum of the Minister of Transport No. 1002/2011
- Website: www.mot.gov.my/en/aviation/agencies/AAIB

The Air Accident Investigation Bureau (AAIB; Malay: Biro Siasatan Kemalangan Udara) is an independent body that investigates civil aviation accidents and incidents that occur in Malaysia, in line with the guidance provided in the Annex 13 of the Convention on International Civil Aviation (ICAO Annex 13) and in compliance with the requirements of the Civil Aviation Regulations 2016 (CAR 2016). The AAIB operates under of the Ministry of Transport of the Government of Malaysia, stationed in Putrajaya, and reports directly to the Minister of Transport.

== Overview ==
The AAIB was created in 2011 by the Cabinet of Malaysia under the Memorandum of the Minister of Transport No. 1002/2011. It established the bureau within the Ministry of Transport as an independent investigation entity. The AAIB oversees the investigations of air accidents and incidents involving Malaysian and foreign registered aircraft in Malaysia, as well as overseas investigations involving Malaysian registered aircraft. The bureau also conducts research and development activities to prevent future accidents.

== Future ==
In 2017, efforts were initiated to transform the bureau from one covering only aviation accidents and safety to encompass all modes of transportation in Malaysia, including maritime, rail and road. The idea for the single board was mooted following the 2013 Genting Highlands bus crash. The current AAIB, modeled after the British Department for Transport, would be called the Malaysia Transport Safety Board (MTSB), similar to the US NTSB and Australian Transport Safety Bureau.

The proposal was first drafted in 2019, but the presentation was delayed due to the COVID-19 pandemic. A second proposal was drafted, but was deferred in 2022.

== See also ==
- Malaysia Airlines Flight 370
- Malaysia Airlines Flight 17
