= Fire Fighter Fatality Investigation and Prevention Program =

- Example investigation document

Overview
- Founded: 1998
- Part of: National Institute for Occupational Safety and Health
- Official website: www.cdc.gov/niosh/fire/default.html

The Fire Fighter Fatality Investigation and Prevention Program (FFFIPP) is administered by the National Institute for Occupational Safety and Health (NIOSH), part of the Centers for Disease Control and Prevention (CDC). It performs independent investigations of firefighter fatalities in the United States, also referred to as line of duty deaths (LODD).

The programs goals are:

- to better define the characteristics of line of duty deaths among firefighters
- to develop recommendations for the prevention of deaths and injuries
- to disseminate prevention strategies to the fire service.

In 1998, Congress funded NIOSH to implement FFFIPP recognizing the need for further efforts to address the continuing national problem of occupational fire fighter fatalities--an estimated 105 each year. The NIOSH-FFFIPP has a 14-person staff and a $2 million budget and has conducted over 400 investigations since its inception in 1998.

In April 2014, Fire Engineering reported the release of a NIOSH map tracking firefighter deaths as part of the FFFIPP program.

In August 2024, NIOSH put out a request for comment in the Federal Register as to whether to include "human factors" in investigations.

== See also ==
- Crew Resource Management
- Firefighter
- Human Factors Analysis and Classification System
- National Fire Fighter Near-Miss Reporting System
- National Fallen Firefighters Memorial
- IAFF Fallen Fire Fighters Memorial
