= Aviation safety improvement initiatives =

The Aviation Safety Improvement Initiatives are aviation safety partnership between Regulators, manufacturers, operators and professional unions, research organisations, international organisations to further enhance safety.

The major Safety initiatives worldwide are:

- Commercial Aviation Safety Team (CAST) in the US,
- International Helicopter Safety Team (IHST),
- European Strategic Safety Initiative (ESSI) in Europe.

== Commercial Aviation Safety Team (CAST) ==
The Commercial Aviation Safety Team was founded in 1998 with a goal to reduce the fixed-wing commercial aviation fatality rate in the United States by 80 percent by 2007. By 2007 CAST was able to report that by implementing safety enhancements, the fatality rate of commercial air travel in the United States was reduced by 83 percent.

== The International Helicopter Safety Team (IHST) ==
=== Background, goal and methods ===
The International Helicopter Safety Team (IHST) was formed after the International Helicopter Safety Symposium (IHSS) in Montreal, Canada in September 2005, where the central theme was a recognition that long term helicopter accident rates have remained unacceptably high and trends have not shown significant improvement in the last 20 years. A call to action was unanimously accepted by those in attendance at IHSS 2005.

The IHST was created to lead a government and industry cooperative effort to address the unacceptably high long-term helicopter accident rates. The IHST chose to pursue the goal of reducing the worldwide civil and military helicopter accident rates by 80% in 10 years by adopting the methods that have been used by the Commercial Aviation Safety Team (CAST) to substantially reduce the worldwide fatal accident rate in the commercial air carrier community. The process used by CAST was directly linked to real accident data, used a broad spectrum of industry experts to analyze it and had objective success measurements to ensure that the actions taken were having the desired effect. Accordingly, the IHST chartered the Joint Helicopter Safety Analysis Team (JHSAT) to adapt the CAST process to analyze helicopter accident data and to offer recommendations for reducing the accident rate. The IHST also chartered the Joint Helicopter Safety Implementation Team (JHSIT) to assess the JHSATs’ recommendations and to develop detailed implementation plans for the safety enhancements deemed to have the greatest potential benefit. Industry helicopter safety experts representing operators, airframe and engine manufacturers, and regulators comprise both the JHSAT and the JHSIT.

Adaptation of the CAST process involved changes to ensure that data unique to the helicopter community could be effectively analyzed; however, the basic tenets of the CAST process were preserved: the analyses would be performed by stakeholders, results would be data driven, and the results would be measurable.

=== Organization ===
The all-volunteer IHST effort is coordinated by an Executive Committee which is currently co-chaired by a senior representative of the US FAA's Rotorcraft Directorate and by the President of Helicopter Association International (HAI). Other members represent the American Helicopter Society (AHS) International , the Helicopter Association of Canada (HAC) the European Helicopter Association, the European Helicopter Safety Team, the National Aeronautical and Space Administration (NASA), helicopter manufacturers, and the International Association of Oil & Gas Producers(OGP) .

The initial effort focused on the US helicopter fleet and has grown to encompass international partners in Brazil, Canada, India, Australia, Gulf Cooperative Council, and Japan. In addition EHEST joined in 2007 to cover European helicopter fleet. Outreach efforts are underway in Russia, Mexico, South Africa and Korea.

Pilot wellness has also been addressed through peer-support initiatives. In March 2025, the U.S. Helicopter Safety Team (USHST) launched a Peer Pilot Program to connect helicopter pilots with confidential, peer-based support and mental health resources, supported by trained pilot volunteers and an aviation psychologist; coverage of the program has noted its relevance to high-demand operations such as helicopter emergency medical services (HEMS), search and rescue, and aerial firefighting.

A summary of IHST's recommendations for small operators is posted on HAI's website.

== European Strategic Safety Initiative (ESSI) ==
The European Strategic Safety Initiative (ESSI ) is an aviation safety partnership between EASA, other regulators and the industry. The initiative's objective is to further enhance safety for citizens in Europe and worldwide through safety analysis, implementation of cost effective action plans, and coordination with other safety initiatives worldwide. Participants are drawn from the EASA Member States, the ECAC countries, manufacturers, operators and professional unions, research organisations, the FAA and international organisations such as EUROCONTROL and ICAO.

ESSI was launched by EASA as a ten-year programme on 28 June 2006 and has three components:

- ECAST: European Commercial Aviation Safety Team
- EHEST: European Helicopter Safety Team
- EGAST: European General Aviation Safety Team

=== The European Commercial Aviation Safety Team (ECAST) ===
ECAST addresses large aircraft operations. It was launched in October 2006 by the team that created the ESSI. ECAST is in Europe the equivalent of CAST in the US. ECAST aims at further enhancing fixed-wing commercial aviation safety in Europe, and for European citizen worldwide.

=== The European Helicopter Safety Team (EHEST) ===
EHEST is also the European component of the International Helicopter Safety Team (IHST). EHEST features representatives of manufacturers, operators, research organisations, regulators, accident investigators and military from across Europe. To address the specificities of the safety of helicopter operations in Europe, the European members of the IHST established EHEST in November 2006. The European Helicopter Safety Analysis Team (EHSAT) is the safety team of EHEST. EHSAT has been formed with the purpose of developing a process for analysis of European helicopter accidents and then the performance of the analysis. To tackle the variety of languages used in accident reports and optimise the use of resources, EHSAT has set up seven regional analysis teams across Europe, with the objective of covering more than 89% of the European fleet in 2007. Consolidation of results is performed by EHSAT with the support of EASA.

=== The European General Aviation Safety Team (EGAST) ===
In Europe, like in other regions of the world, General Aviation is a dispersed community. Air sports and recreational aviation embrace a wide spectrum of airborne activities, ranging from powered flying, ballooning and gliding to newly invented activities such as sky-surfing, micro light flying and paragliding. EGAST build on the national general aviation initiatives in Europe and create a forum for sharing safety data and best practices in Europe.

== Other Safety improvement Initiatives in the world ==
- Africa African Safety Enhancement Team (ASET)
- COSCAP Bangul Accord Group
- COSCAP Communate Economique et Monétaire de l'Afrique Centrale (CEMAC)
- COSCAP Union Economique et Monétaire Ouest Africaine (UEMOA)
- Asia/Pacific Cooperative Development of Operational Safety and Continuing Airworthiness Program (COSCAP).
- Central/South America Pan American Aviation Safety Team (PAAST)
- Middle East COSCAP Gulf States Russia COSCAP Commonwealth of Independent States

== See also ==
- EASA
- FAA
- ICAO
- Civil Aviation Authority
- Air safety
- Accident
