= Threat and error management =

Safety management approach

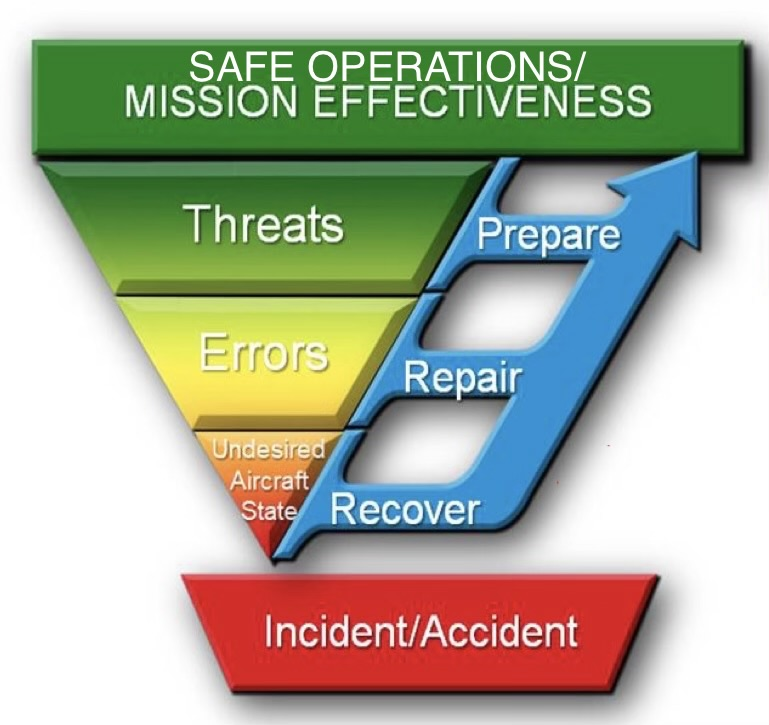
Threat and Error Management Model

In aviation safety, threat and error management (TEM) is an overarching safety management approach that assumes that pilots will naturally make mistakes and encounter risky situations during flight operations. Rather than try to avoid these threats and errors, its primary focus is on teaching pilots to manage these issues so they do not impair safety. Its goal is to maintain safety margins by training pilots and flight crews to detect and respond to events that are likely to cause damage (threats) as well as mistakes that are most likely to be made (errors) during flight operations.

TEM allows crews to measure the complexities of a specific organization's context — meaning that the threats and errors encountered by pilots will vary depending upon the type of flight operation — and record human performance in that context. TEM also considers technical (e.g. mechanical) and environmental issues, and incorporates strategies from Crew Resource Management to teach pilots to manage threats and errors.

Threat and error management (TEM) is also referenced in ICAO training procedures, including material describing the TEM model and procedures applicable to pilots. Guidance material for operators and regulators has also described TEM as closely linked with modern CRM training practices.

The TEM framework was developed in 1994 by psychologists at University of Texas based on the investigation of accidents of high capacity Regular Public Transport (RPT) airlines. However, an evaluation method was needed to identify threats and errors during flight operations and to add information to existing TEM data. A Line Operations Safety Audit (LOSA) serves this purpose and involves the identification and collection of safety-related information — on crew performance, environmental conditions, and operational complexity — by a highly trained observer. LOSA data is used to assess the effectiveness of an organization's training program and to find out how trained procedures are being implemented in day-to-day flights.

== Importance of TEM ==
Threat and error management is an important element in the training of competent pilots that can effectively manage in-flight challenges. Many strategies have been developed (e.g. training, teamwork, reallocating workload) that were focused on improving on stress, fatigue, and error. Flight crew training stressed the importance of operational procedures and technical knowledge, with less emphasis placed on nontechnical skills, which became isolated from the real-world operational contexts. Safety training, including TEM, is important because a crew's nontechnical (safety) knowledge helps more in managing errors effectively than crews' familiarization with operations through experience. Candidates who are shortlisted during selection and training processes must demonstrate analytical and coordination capabilities. Possessing these nontechnical skills allows pilots and crew members to carry out their duties efficiently and effectively.

== Applications in rotorcraft operations and pilot well-being ==
Threat and error management has been adapted for rotorcraft operations through guidance and training materials for helicopter pilots and instructors. The European Helicopter Safety Team (EHEST) has published training leaflets describing how TEM can be applied in helicopter operations and aligned with ICAO and EASA human factors training requirements. EASA has also described the use of helicopter-focused line observation safety audits (LOSA) as a data source for evidence-based training development in areas such as offshore and helicopter emergency medical services operations. In offshore helicopter operations, the Flight Safety Foundation's Basic Aviation Risk Standard (BARS) Offshore Helicopter Operations standard includes a structured LOSA program as part of an operator's safety management system, intended to supplement other monitoring tools with de-identified cockpit observations of how crews manage routine threats and errors.

In parallel, some aviation safety initiatives link TEM principles with peer-support programs intended to address latent threats such as stress and fatigue. The U.S. Helicopter Safety Team (USHST) has developed a Peer Pilot Program that provides confidential, non-punitive peer support and referrals, framing pilot well-being as part of broader human factors and safety culture efforts in the helicopter community.

== Components of TEM ==
The following components are methods that help provide data for the TEM.

=== LOSA observation training ===
Training for LOSA experts includes two sessions: education in procedural protocols, and TEM concepts and classifications. A LOSA trainee is taught to find data first and then code them later for both sessions, during which a crew member must exhibit "LOSA Etiquette" — ability to notify the pilot as to why he or she was not able to detect an error or threat after a flight. The pilot's responsibilities include his or her opinions on what safety issues could have had an adverse impact on their operations. A LOSA trainee must then record the specific responses of the pilot and thereafter code performance using behavioral markers. The order of the recording is as follows: a) record visible threats; b) identify error types, crew's responses, and specific outcomes; and c) use CRM behavioral markers to rate crew.

Observers will finally record a pilot's overall response on a 4-point Likert scale: 1) poor, 2) marginal, 3) good, and 4) outstanding. The data are then quantified and tabulated as exemplified by the following format:

Planning and execution of performance

Task	Task Description	Comments	Rating
Monitor cross-check	Active monitoring of crews	Situational awareness maintained	Outstanding
SOP briefing	Carried out necessary briefings	Thorough understanding of procedures	Outstanding
Contingency Management	Communicate strategies	Good management of threats and errors.	Outstanding

Identified Threats	Managed	Mismanaged	*Frequency (N)
Air Traffic Control	17	2	19
Airline Operational Pressure	9	0	9
Weather	6	6	12

Frequency is the total number of threats that occurred and is denoted by N.

=== Categories of the LOSA ===
LOSA identifies three main categories that must be recorded:

- Errors include procedural errors (mistakes or inadequacy of attention towards a task at hand), and violation of SOP (intentional or unintentional). Crew members are encouraged not to be afraid of admitting their mistakes, they must be able to criticize themselves since the learning process helps them understand the potential danger presented other crew members.
- Undesired Aircraft States are aircraft configurations or circumstances that are caused either by human error or by external factors. The management of unintended states is vital since they can result in serious aircraft accidents. For example, navigation problems on the cockpit display may lead a pilot to make an incorrect decisions, potentially causing injuries or fatality to passengers and crew members alike.

=== Safety change process ===
Safety change process (SCP), which is part of LOSA, is a formal mechanism that airlines can use to identify active and latent threats to flight operations. It is a guideline that communicates in detail what is an imminent threat to current operations or who is causing the threat. In the past, SCP data were based on investigation of accidents or incidents, experiences, and intuitions but nowadays SCP focuses more on the precursors to accidents. There are several steps involved in conducting SCP:

Safety Change Process (SCP) model

1. Collect safety issues (LOSA expert)
8. Revise any changes
7. Observe the impact of changes

2. Conduct detailed analysis of Risks/data
Safety Change Process
6. Apply changes to operations

3. Identify improvement strategies
4. Risk Analysis
5. Funding of changes

An unnamed airline conducted base-line observations from 1996 to 1998 using the defined SCP and LOSA data to improve its organization's safety culture and the results were positive. The crew error-trapping rate was significantly increased to 55%, meaning that crews were able to detect about 55% of the errors they caused. A 40% reduction in errors related to checklist performance and a 62% reduction in unstabilized approaches (tailstrikes, controlled flight into terrain, runway excursions, etc.) were observed. A proper review and management of SCP and LOSA data can prevent further disasters in flight operations.

== See also ==
- Accident Classification
- Aviation safety
- Crew Resource Management
- Pilot Error
- Error Management
- The curse of expertise
