= MV Salvador Allende =

MV Salvador Allende was a cargo ship that sank in December 1994 in the North Atlantic Ocean with the loss of 29 of her 31 crew members.

Salvador Allende was built by the Warnowwerft shipyard of Warnemünde, in what was then East Germany. She was launched on 30 July 1973, and was delivered to Cuban owners. She had a gross tonnage of 10,977 GT and a deadweight tonnage of 12,007 DWT, and measured 150 metres (490 ft) long, with a beam of 21.8 metres (72 ft). She was powered by a single diesel engine that gave her a service speed of 19 knots (35 km/h). At the time of her loss, Salvador Allende was owned by the Black Sea Shipping Company of Ukraine.

In early December 1994, Salvador Allende was sailing eastbound from the American port of Freeport, Texas to Helsinki, Finland, with 31 crew on board and a cargo of rice when she encountered a severe storm. Late on 8 December, the crew made a distress call saying that the ship was taking on water and listing. Early in the morning of 9 December, Salvador Allende sank about 850 miles (1,370 km) southeast of Nova Scotia. The United States Coast Guard launched a rescue mission, aided by commercial vessels and military aircraft from both the US and Canada. During the day, at least three ships and a Canadian aircraft had located survivors in the water on lifeboats and floating debris, but due heavy seas and impending nightfall, the Coast Guard chose to wait until the following day to attempt to recover them.

Before dawn on 10 December, the cargo ship Torungen retrieved one survivor from Salvador Allende, the ship's second mate. Late in the morning, a second sailor floating in the water was rescued by the crew of a New York Air National Guard helicopter about 75 miles (121 km) from where the ship sank. The bodies of seven sailors were recovered by ships; the remaining 22 were not found.
