= Aerial saw =

Flying tree trimmer

A ten-blade saw demonstrated by FirstEnergy in 2017

An aerial saw is a saw which is flown through the air. The aerial saw may also be known as a helicopter aerial saw.

Large aerial saws are flown by helicopter to trim trees in remote locations when they overgrow power lines, pipelines or other infrastructure. A design used in the Appalachian region has ten circular saws on a twenty-foot shaft which is carried by an MD 500 helicopter, typically using a rigid boom of about 80 feet (24 m) long on a gimbal mount, so that the saw can swing below the aircraft. The saw blades are powered by a 28-horsepower engine and the assembly weighs 830 pounds (380 kg). This design is used to prune trees for customers such as American Electric Power. Another design, with a single, horizontal, 47-inch (120 cm) circular saw blade, is used to cut the tops off trees which are at risk of falling across power lines.

== Operation ==
The aerial saw is not used only to make new paths for transmission or power lines, but also for maintaining the paths initially cut by the aerial saws. The aerial saw is suspended from a helicopter able to support the swinging weight of the saw. Once the saw is attached to the helicopter, it is turned on and precisely piloted alongside potentially troublesome tree branches. Normally, more than one pass by the branches is needed to ensure adequate coverage. The branches are then picked up by a ground crew and disposed of properly.

== Design ==
The design of the aerial saw is fairly simple. It involves ten 2-foot (61 cm) diameter circular saw blades (normally seen in Table saws) mounted on a vertical shaft which is around twenty feet long. Those ten circular saw blades are driven by a 28 horsepower engine. The engine is able to run all ten blades at speeds up to four-thousand revolutions per minute (RPM). The shaft is then attached to a 90-foot (27 m) aluminum boom (or beam) then attached to the helicopter where the pilot can remotely control the saw.

== Safety & Regulations ==
The aerial saw facilitates the quick removal of tree branches that are a potential hazard, but is itself inherently dangerous due to its construction and size. In order for one of these saws to be used in a residential area, a safety buffer must be in place prior to work. The operation must be monitored and certified by the Federal Aviation Administration (FAA) and covered by insurance.

== History ==
Prior to 1983, the side trimming of trees for electric utilities was done by climbing crews or workers armed with mechanical trimmers. In 1983 Randall Rogers of Pea Ridge Arkansas flew the first Helicopter Aerial Saw. Following Rogers' death, Aerial Solutions Inc. (ASI) purchased the Aerial Saw patent. They then pioneered the use of helicopters for side trimming of paths for more than 20 utility, pipeline companies, and governmental agencies throughout the United States. American Electric Power (AEP) began using the aerial saw to clear out paths for transmission lines in 1986. These transmission lines were first established in Virginia, West Virginia, Kentucky and Tennessee, where the terrain is known to be very mountainous and difficult to access with hand power tools.
