= Coastal Carolina Council =

Boy Scouts of America council in South Carolina

- Owner: Boy Scouts of America
- Headquarters: Charleston, South Carolina
- Location: South Carolina
- Country: United States
- Scout Executive: Legare Clement
- Website http://www.coastalcarolinabsa.org/

The Coastal Carolina Council is a Boy Scouts of America council that services much of the South Carolina Lowcountry. It operates five districts and two scout camps, Camp Ho Non Wah and Camp Moultrie.

== Organization ==
- Black River District
- Etiwan District
- Lowcountry District
- Palmetto District
- Swamp Fox District

== History ==
The Coastal Carolina Council began in the 1920s as the Charleston County Council. In 1931, the Bailey family of Wadmalaw Island allowed the scouts to camp in front of their plantation house. The Bailey family would eventually leave the entire plantation to the CCC, becoming Camp Ho Non Wah. In 1943, the council began its Order of the Arrow lodge—Unali'Yi. In the 1960s, the council re-numbered their troops by district (i.e. Troop 29 became Troop 329 because they were in the third district). In the 1980s, the council office was moved from downtown Charleston to off of Sam Rittenburg Boulevard. In 2017 the Council office was again moved to its new location at 9297 Medical Plaza Drive in North Charleston after the sale of the Highway 7 property.

1920 – Charleston Council is chartered. The Scout office was located at 207 East Bay Street in downtown Charleston.

1932 – The Coastal Carolina Council acquires a Camp on the Bohicket River and it is christened Camp Ho Non Wah, which means "The Land of Rising and Falling Waters".

1940 – The Coastal Carolina Council was formed with the merger of the larger Charleston Council, (formed in 1921) which covered Charleston, Berkeley and Dorchester counties, with the smaller councils of Beaufort, Walterboro and Georgetown.

1940 – Coastal Carolina Council acquires Camp Gregg in Dorchester County off Dorchester Road. Today the subdivision known as White Hall has been built.

1943 - 33 candidates go through the first Order of the Arrow Ordeal in May and Unali’Yi Lodge #236 is born at Camp Ho Non Wah.

1950s – Camp Moultrie was donated to Coastal Carolina Council by Santee Cooper for a Scout Camp and consist of 12 acres on Lake Moultrie.

1968 – The Unaliyi Lodge – Order of the Arrow and Scouts of the Coastal Carolina Council establish the Swamp Fox Trail in the National Forest. Originally its two trail heads were the Fire Tower at Awendaw and Huger State Park. The trail is named after General Francis Marion. In 1980 the trails was turned over to the National Trail System, this trail is now part of the Palmetto Trail that spans the entire state.

1979 – Coastal Carolina Council sells Camp Gregg to investors.

1980s - The Coastal Carolina Council office was moved from downtown Charleston to off of Sam Rittenburg Boulevard.

2017 – The Council office was again moved to its new location at 9297 Medical Plaza Drive in North Charleston after the sale of the Highway 7 property.

== Camps ==
=== Camp Ho Non Wah ===
Camp Ho Non Wah is located on Wadmalaw Island at the intersection of the Bohicket River and the Fickling Creek, both tidal bodies of water. Ho Non Wah means the Land of the Rising and Falling Waters. In the 1980s the camp underwent a facelift, as many of its buildings were dated from the 1940s. The Bailey plantation house has never been destroyed, though, and has been converted to a permanent home for the OA lodge.

=== Camp Moultrie ===
Camp Moultrie is located on Lake Moultrie just outside Moncks Corner. The Camp is available for year-round use, and offers a great opportunity for Boy Scout water front activities (Sailing, Kayaking, Canoeing, Swimming).
