= National Fire Fighter Near-Miss Reporting System =

Fire Fighter Near Miss Reporting System
- Founded: August 12, 2005
- Purpose: The Firefighter Near Miss Reporting System’s mission is to assist responders with managing risk by gathering lessons learned from real world experiences and sharing them globally.
- Location(s): Chantilly, Virginia; U.S.
- Region served: Worldwide
- Website: www.firefighternearmiss.com

The Fire Fighter Near Miss Reporting System was launched on August 12, 2005, by the International Association of Fire Chiefs. It was announced at a press conference in Denver, Colorado, after having completed a pilot program involving 38 fire departments across the country. The Near Miss Reporting System aims to prevent injuries and save lives of other firefighters by collecting, sharing and analyzing near-miss experiences. The near-miss experiences are collected by firefighters who voluntarily submit them; the reports are confidential, non-punitive, and secure. After the reports are compiled, they are posted to the website where firefighters can access them and learn from each other's real-life experiences. Overall these reports help to formulate strategies, reduce firefighter injuries and fatalities, and enhance the safety culture of the fire service. The program is based on the Aviation Safety Reporting System (ASRS), which has been gathering reports of close calls from pilots, flight attendants, air traffic controllers since 1976. The reporting system is funded by the International Association of Fire Chiefs.

== Near-miss event ==
A near-miss event is defined as an opportunity to improve health and safety practices based on a condition or an incident with potential for more serious consequence.".

== Near-miss report ==
A near-miss report consists of five sections:

Section 1: Reporter Information	This section is designed to provide basic knowledge about the report submitter. (title, years of fire service experience, department type, etc.)
Section 2: Event Information	This section provides information about the near-miss event. (type, cause, etc.)
Section 3: Event Description	This section contains a detailed narrative. It is the key to successful data collection and trend analysis.
Section 4: Lessons Learned	The key to any near miss report is the lesson learned. In this section reporters are asked to describe what they learned to prevent the near-miss from happening again. They can share these lessons with the fire service community at large to prevent the event from occurring again.
Section 5: Contact Information (Optional)	The information is kept confidential. If a reviewer has questions they will make contact with the reporter one time to have the questions answered. Then the contact information is deleted and is not kept in association with the report in any way.

=== Report of the Week ===
Every Wednesday there is a new Report of the Week. These reports are available online and can be emailed for free with a Report of the Week subscription. They are ideal tools used for training and for informational purposes.

The reports chosen are recent and contain discussion questions for further thought. They are also matched with 5 similar reports from previous years. These reports give readers insight to what is currently going on, and how people are dealing with their near-misses. The discussion questions help readers understand what actions need to be taken in order to prevent further near-misses. Many subscribers use the reports for informal training drills, forward the reports to other fire departments, or use them for their own informational needs.

== Resources ==
The Fire Fighter Near-Miss Reporting System website offers many different resources to its users. As mentioned above, there is a Report of the Week, which offers a training tool for departments all over the country. In addition to the Report of the Week, there are illustrated case studies, videos, grouped reports, and photos.

Videos and Photos: You can find many different visuals here that can help you understand the reports.
Near-Miss Calendar: The Near-Miss calendar contains case studies and other information about the program.

== Human Factors Analysis and Classification System (HFACS) ==
The U.S. Navy's Human Factors Analysis and Classification System (HFACS) was selected as the first tool for analyzing firefighter near-miss reports. HFACS takes four levels of individual and institutional performance into consideration.

1. Unsafe acts
2. Preconditions to unsafe acts
3. Unsafe supervision
4. Organizational influences

=== HFACS level 1 - Unsafe acts ===
The "unsafe acts" level contains two categories: errors and violations. The determination that an unsafe act has occurred is not an indictment of an individual firefighter or firefighters. So far, statistics have shown that 80% of reported near misses have occurred when firefighters were following established procedures. Errors are classified as resulting from lack of skill, education or training, poor decision making, or misperception. Each in turn can be broken down into omissions, failure to prioritize, poor technique, misinterpretation of conditions, wrong response to conditions, and decision errors.

=== HFACS level 2 - Preconditions to unsafe acts ===
The "preconditions to unsafe acts" level focuses on the individuals involved. Was the individual focused or distracted? Was the individual hurried? Was the individual physically ill or otherwise unfit for duty? Was the individual somehow incompatible with the assigned task? The team is also analyzed. For example, are the team members familiar with, and do they practice crew resource management and personal readiness?

=== HFACS level 3 - Unsafe supervision ===
The "unsafe supervision" level mirrors the military's emphasis on the officer's role in all aspects of operations. Specifically it looks at factors like inadequate supervision, poor planning, failure to correct problems, and other supervisory problems.

=== HFACS level 4 - Organizational influences ===
The "organizational influences" level is the final level of evaluation. It acknowledges that a fire departments top management is ultimately responsible for organizational culture, and may have contributed to some degree to a firefighter's actions that led to a near-miss event.

== Error management ==
Based on the first year of data, the various working groups of the National Fire Fighter Near-Miss Reporting System have offered the following recommendations for error-management and to improve firefighter performance and safety.

- Require a 360-degree evaluation of all structures prior to interior operations.
- Require all officers to perform a risk/benefit analysis. When the risk exceeds the benefit, safety trumps exposure to harm.
- Adopt an error management philosophy at the department level and distinguish between good faith errors and willful disregard for policy.
- Explore and adopt crew resource management to improve leader performance, crew safety, and incident management.
- Aggressive mentalities need to transition into purposeful action mentalities. Blind "duty to act" mindsets create harmful institutional climates and put firefighters in unnecessary danger.
- Fire departments must share knowledge gained from near-misses that were prevented by following procedure, as well as those that occur due to error.
- The near-miss reporting system should add questions about SOPs/SOGs, supervisor training, and organizational elements to aid in the review process.

== See also ==
- Crew resource management
- Fire Fighter Fatality Investigation and Prevention Program
- Human reliability
- Swiss cheese model
