= Guided visual approaches =

Systems to aid visual approach to a runway

Guided visual approaches are visual approach procedures or avionics functions that provide lateral (and sometimes advisory vertical) guidance during a visually conducted approach to a runway. They are intended to support stabilized approach techniques in visual conditions, but they are not the same as instrument approach procedures and do not remove the pilot’s responsibility to maintain visual separation from terrain, obstacles, and other traffic.

== Terminology ==
In practice, “guided visual approach” may refer to different implementations depending on the regulator and avionics system:

- In the United States, air traffic control may issue certain RNAV Visual Flight Procedures (RVFP) to authorized operators in visual meteorological conditions (VMC). RVFP are designed and evaluated using FAA procedure criteria and are handled in ATC operations under FAA guidance.
- In Europe, EASA has published safety information discussing RNP Visual Manoeuvring with Prescribed Track (RNP VPT), which provides a prescribed RNP-based track for the visual manoeuvring segment under defined conditions and oversight.
- In business and general aviation avionics, manufacturers and operators use the term for FMS- or navigator-generated visual guidance functions intended to assist pilots once cleared for a visual approach, typically as advisory guidance that still requires visual conditions and pilot monitoring.

== Operational use ==
Guided visual procedures are generally used only when the runway environment can be maintained visually. FAA air traffic guidance for RVFP emphasizes operator authorization and controller handling specific to these procedures.

Regardless of implementation, pilots remain responsible for:

- maintaining obstacle/terrain clearance using visual reference,
- complying with ATC instructions and separation responsibilities applicable to the clearance, and
- monitoring the aircraft flight path and energy state during the visual segment.

EASA safety material on RNP VPT highlights that such operations require clear procedures, training, and operational oversight because they combine performance-based navigation with visually flown segments.

== Design and criteria ==
RNAV-based visual procedures are typically created using published procedure design criteria that define assumptions, obstacle evaluation concepts, and coding requirements for navigation systems. The FAA publishes specific criteria and policy for RNAV visual flight procedures in its procedure-design orders.

== Safety considerations ==
Industry and aviation-safety discussions commonly describe guided visual technology as supporting stabilized approaches and reducing workload during busy terminal operations, while also warning that pilots can over-rely on advisory guidance if they do not maintain visual scanning and energy management.

== See also ==
- Visual approach
- Instrument approach
- Performance-based navigation
- Required navigation performance
- Area navigation
- Flight management system
