= Accident classification =

Ways of classifying accidents

Accidents can be classified into several categories based on various criteria. One common classification is based on the severity of the outcome:

1. Fatal accidents: These accidents result in the death of one or more individuals involved.

2. Serious accidents: These accidents cause severe injuries that may have long-lasting impacts on the individuals involved.

3. Minor accidents: These accidents result in minor injuries that usually require little to no medical intervention.

Another way to classify accidents is based on the type of event that caused them:

1. Traffic accidents: These accidents occur on roads and highways involving vehicles such as cars, motorcycles, and trucks.

2. Occupational accidents: These accidents happen in the workplace and can involve slips, falls, machinery malfunctions, or exposure to hazardous substances.

3. Home accidents: These accidents occur within residential settings and can include falls, burns, and poisoning.

Accidents can also be classified based on the factors contributing to their occurrence:

1. Human error accidents: These accidents result from mistakes or negligence on the part of individuals involved, such as distracted driving or failure to follow safety protocols.

2. Mechanical failure accidents: These accidents occur due to faults or malfunctioning equipment or systems, such as a car crash caused by brake failure.

Understanding these classifications can help in developing effective preventive measures and safety protocols to reduce the occurrence of accidents and mitigate their impacts. By analyzing the different types of accidents and their underlying causes, individuals and organizations can proactively address potential risks and create safer environments for everyone.

A good accident classification system

- is easy to apply, ideally it is intuitive to use,
- covers as many aspects as possible: human performance, organisational issues, technological issues, Threat and error management,
- enables the safety experts to recreate the sequence of causal factors and how they correlate with each other.

== Accident vs incident classification ==
A good accident classification taxonomy is also suitable for incident investigation. The difference between an accident and an incident is the end state. While the end state in an incident is always recoverable, it is not in an accident. Examples for an end state in aviation: in an incident the end state could be a "Controlled Flight Towards Terrain" which is then recovered, while in an accident it would be a "Controlled Flight Into Terrain", which cannot be recovered. The causal factors leading to either one can be analysed with one and the same accident classification system.

== Accident classification systems ==
- The IATA accident classification system was developed by members of the IATA Accident Classification Task Force. It is based on the threat-and-error management framework of Helmreich (UT) and James Klinect. The taxonomy covers the organisation, environmental and airline threats, technical failures, human performance issues and in particular breakdown of communication. The IATA accident classification taxonomy also looks into which prevention strategies could have prevented the accident.
- Human factors analysis and classification system (HFACS) was developed by Wiegman and Shappell. This taxonomy is based on the Swiss cheese model of James Reason.
