= Error management theory =

Theory of perception and cognition biases

Error management theory (EMT) is an approach to perception and cognition biases originally coined by David Buss and Martie Haselton. Error management training is a related area that uses this theory. The objective of it is to encourage trainees to make errors and encourage them in reflection to understand the causes of those errors and to identify suitable strategies to avoid making them in future.

Various biases in thinking and decision-making have been highlighted by Daniel Kahneman and have been shown to cause cognitive errors in psychological and economic decisions. Cognitive biases in error management theory refer to biases and heuristics that have undergone positive selection because they confer evolutionary benefits. According to this theory, recurrent cost asymmetries between two types of errors Type 1 and 2 over evolutionary time should result in a bias to make the less costly error (i.e., adaptive rationality leads to cognitive biases).

Error management theory asserts that evolved mindreading mechanisms will be biased to produce more of one type of inferential error than another. These mindreading biases have been examined in the domain of mating psychology. Error management theory provides a possible explanation for the discovery that men often tend to overperceive women's sexual interest and women tend to underperceive men's commitment intent. The theory has been supported by empirical findings, but researchers are still testing and refining it. Newer research suggests exceptions and refinements to the theory, such as postmenopausal effects, the possible projection of sexual and commitment self-interest, and other differences including unrestricted sociosexuality.

== Type errors ==
In the decision-making process, when faced with uncertainty, a subject can make two possible errors: type I or type II.

A type I error is a false positive, thinking that an effect is there, when it is not. For example, acting on a fire alarm that turns out to be false. When someone infers sexual interest, where there is none, then a false-positive error has occurred.

A type II error is a false negative, not seeing an effect where one exists. Ignoring the fire alarm that turns out to be accurate, due to scepticism, illustrates this point. Falsely inferring a lack of intent about sexual interest means a false negative error has occurred.

== Sexual overperception bias ==
=== Males ===
One of the aims of error management theory is to explain sexual overperception bias. Sexual overperception occurs when a type I error is committed by an individual. An individual committing this type error falsely concludes that someone else has a sexual interest in them. Research has shown that males are more likely than females to commit sexual overperception bias – men tend to overestimate women's sexual interest while women tend to underestimate men's. This is theorised to be likely due to the fact that the reproductive costs of sexual underperception are greater for men than the risk of making false positives. Men who perceive themselves as especially high in mate value are especially prone to experiencing this phenomenon. In addition, men who are also more inclined to pursue a short term mating strategy exhibit a more prominent case of sexual overperception bias.

=== Manipulation ===
Differences in perceptions of sexual interest between men and women may be exploited by both genders. Men may present themselves as more emotionally invested in a woman than they actually are in order to gain sexual access; 71% of men report engaging in this form of manipulation and 97% of women report having experienced this form of manipulation. Women may present themselves as more sexually interested in a man than they actually are in order to fulfill other needs and desires. The manipulations create conflicts between men and women as to the status of their relationships. Women on the receiving end of emotional manipulation may complain that the relationship is moving too quickly while men on the receiving end of sexual manipulation may complain about "being led on".

=== Exceptions ===
==== The sister effect ====
The sister effect is an exception to male overperception bias. Haselton and Buss (2000) found that sexual overperception bias would not occur when the target the men had to perceive sexual intent from was their sister. They found that the men's perception of their sister's sexual intent was lower than their perception of sexual intent from other females. Haselton and Buss (2000) believed that this perception of female sexual interest was most accurate as it fell between women's perception of women (high interest) and women's perception of their own sexual interest (low interest). This could be a product of incest-avoidance mechanisms.

==== Sexual and commitment self-interest ====
Sexual underperception in males is also observed, in cases where men report low levels of their own sexual interest. A person's own level of attraction, rather than their gender, may lead to over or under-perception. The exact mechanism for this is unclear but it is suggested that individuals may project their own level of sexual and commitment interestedness on to their interaction partner, whether they are in a relationship with them or they were strangers before the interaction.

==== Male insensitivity bias ====
A different explanation for the presence of both overperception and underperception in men is the male insensitivity bias. Evidence has shown that males lack perceptual sensitivity, so they are more likely to misperceive friendliness as sexual interest, but also more likely to misperceive sexual interest as friendliness, in comparison to females, something that explains the presence of both biases in males.

== Sexual underperception bias ==
=== Females ===
Women also fall victim to misconceptions during male-female interactions. Haselton and Buss (2000) argued that these errors primarily stem from women's perceived desire for a committed relationship by a male counterpart. Women have evolved strategies to protect themselves from deception. One of these evolved strategies is to commit the Skeptical Commitment Bias.

==== Skeptical commitment bias ====
Women's commitment skepticism arises from the high costs of falsely inferring a mate's commitment to a relationship. It hypothesizes that women have adapted to be cognitively biased towards under perceiving male interest and commitment. This is due to the high cost of a false positive – a man not being committed and a woman accepting him – that could lead to raising a child without an investing mate, reputational damage and risk reducing chances of future courtship. The cost of a false negative – a man that is committed and a woman rejecting him – is far less costly to the female. Women are limited to how many children they can have in a lifetime. However, men are not limited and can reproduce multiple times. Therefore, overperception costs are higher for females. This hypothesis is mentioned briefly by Buss (2012).

Females' commitment skepticism is unique to humans. For other animals, courtship rituals are not particularly varied and there is no guesswork or ambiguity involved. For instance, a long-tailed manakin bird has a mating dance that is instinctive and intricate and requires a young apprentice to perform as a duet to the female. If the dance is good enough the female will mate with the male, if the duet falls flat then she will not choose him to reproduce with. However, human courtship behaviour is more ambiguous and so requires these types of cognitive biases to avoid costly errors, in this case, sexual deception.

=== Exceptions ===
==== "Skeptical dad" and "Encouraging mum" hypothesis ====
Previously, commitment skepticism and overperception biases were thought of as sex specific. Women would underplay or fail to infer a psychological state that is there in order to prevent a false negative error. Men would over perceive female interest because the reproductive costs of sexual under perception are greater for men than women. Al-Shawaf (2016) stated that this is not what the core logic of the Error Management Theory (EMT) suggests. EMT states that the ancestral cost-benefit matrix of both false positive and false negative errors is what drives the cognitive biases and decision-making processes, not gender which is what it has been defined by.

Imagine a woman is assessing her potential mate's commitment intent. The woman's father also has a vested interest in whether she reproduces because he shares genes with her and thus, his reproductive interests extend to his daughter's mate choice. The father also has to evaluate the costs and benefits of the two types of errors she could make when evaluating her mate's commitment intent. If the chosen mate sexually deceives and then leaves her then the outcome is more costly for him than if his daughter is more cautious and underestimates intent. Thus, the father might take time before offering his parental seal of approval. The father shows the same skeptical commitment bias as his daughter, favouring the false negative error because it is less costly.

Taking the parental dynamic and switching it from father to mother, the same could be said for sexual overperception bias. A mother has an interest in who her son decides to mate with and therefore will favour the false positive error over false negative. If she fails to detect real interest in the woman, and thus, fails to share this female interest with her son, then it is more costly to her than if she falsely detects sexual interest from a woman towards her son and encourages him to pursue. If her son misses an opportunity, he has missed the chance to pass on his, and in doing so her own, genes. Therefore, the mother shows the same overperception bias as her son, favouring the false positive error because it is less costly.

It is not sex or gender that predicts what type of cognitive bias might be expressed but rather the potential costs to reproductive success.

==== Postmenopausal females ====
Contrasting the evidence for fertile females, skeptical commitment bias does not occur in postmenopausal women. Haselton and Buss (2000) found evidence for the perception biases studying young subjects; however, this was not representative of older females, who have passed through menopause. The reason for this disparity between pre- and postmenopausal females is that fertile females underestimate the intentions of males to invest in the relationship, in order to avoid the costs of pregnancy without support; however, postmenopausal women do not perceive such costs. Their inability to conceive means that there is no reason to underestimate a male's intentions.

== Alternative explanations ==
Some recent studies researching error management theory have found men and women's perceptions of opposite gender sexual and commitment interest may be mitigated by other explanations.

=== Culture ===
With a universal proclivity, it would be possible to document the bias across cultures and "across different demographic groups, including among men varying in age, ethnicity, and education level" within cultures and in females based on their job status, health, levels of education and income equality. When investigated in Norway, one of the world's most gender egalitarian societies, error management theory and its evolutionary explanation were supported. In addition, the pattern of misperception of men and women held up across demographic groups differing in relationship status (singles versus partnered participants).

=== Individual differences ===
Sexual over-perception relative to under-perception was reported more frequently among younger participants, among singles, and among participants with an unrestricted socio-sexual orientation. Endorsing and being more open to casual sex may have evoked more sexual interest from members of the opposite sex, leading to more frequent reports of sexual overperception. Socially unrestricted male and female high school students were found to report being more subject to sexual harassment as well as sexually harassing others. From this, it is possible that being subject to sexual over-perception may explain the link between socio-sexuality and being subject to sexual harassment.

=== Projection ===
As stated above what was reported about male sexual and commitment self-interest was also true of women. They self-reported levels of sexual interest and desire for commitment which also predicted their perceptions of their partners' sexual interest and desire for commitment. This implies that instead of males and females falling victims of overperception and underperception respectively, both sexes project their own level of interest onto the individuals they are interacting with.

=== Reciprocity ===
Another explanation that removes overperception and underperception from the picture is how males and females reciprocate the perceived interest in one another. Evidence from speed dating shows that a partner's level of attraction for an individual, influences the individual's own interest in that particular partner. Unlike the "fox and the grapes" approach, which explains how underperception occurs in men as a means of face-saving, reciprocity reflects a real shift in the level of interest in a partner as a result of returning the perceived interest.

== Other examples ==
Similar examples can also be seen in the judgment of whether a noise in the wild was a predator when it was more likely the wind—humans who assumed it was a predator were less likely to be attacked as prey over time than those who were skeptical. This is similar to the animistic fallacy.

Smoke detectors are designed with this theory in mind. Since the cost of a Type I error (false positive, e.g. a nuisance alarm) is much lower than the cost of a Type II error (false negative, e.g. an undetected fire that could burn a house down), the sensitivity threshold of a smoke detector is designed to err on the side of Type I errors. This explains why nuisance alarms are relatively common.

== See also ==
- Reinforcement learning
