= Human Factors Analysis and Classification System =

Method to identify causes of accidents and analysis to plan preventive training

The Human Factors Analysis and Classification System (HFACS) identifies the human causes of an accident and offers tools for analysis as a way to plan preventive training. It was developed by Dr. Scott Shappell of the Civil Aviation Medical Institute and Dr. Doug Wiegmann of the University of Illinois at Urbana-Campaign in response to a trend that showed some form of human error was a primary causal factor in 80% of all flight accidents in the Navy and Marine Corps.

HFACS is based in the "Swiss cheese model" of human error which looks at four levels of human failure, including unsafe acts, preconditions for unsafe acts, unsafe supervision, and organizational influences. It is a comprehensive human error framework that folded James Reason's ideas into the applied setting, defining 19 causal categories within four levels of human failure.

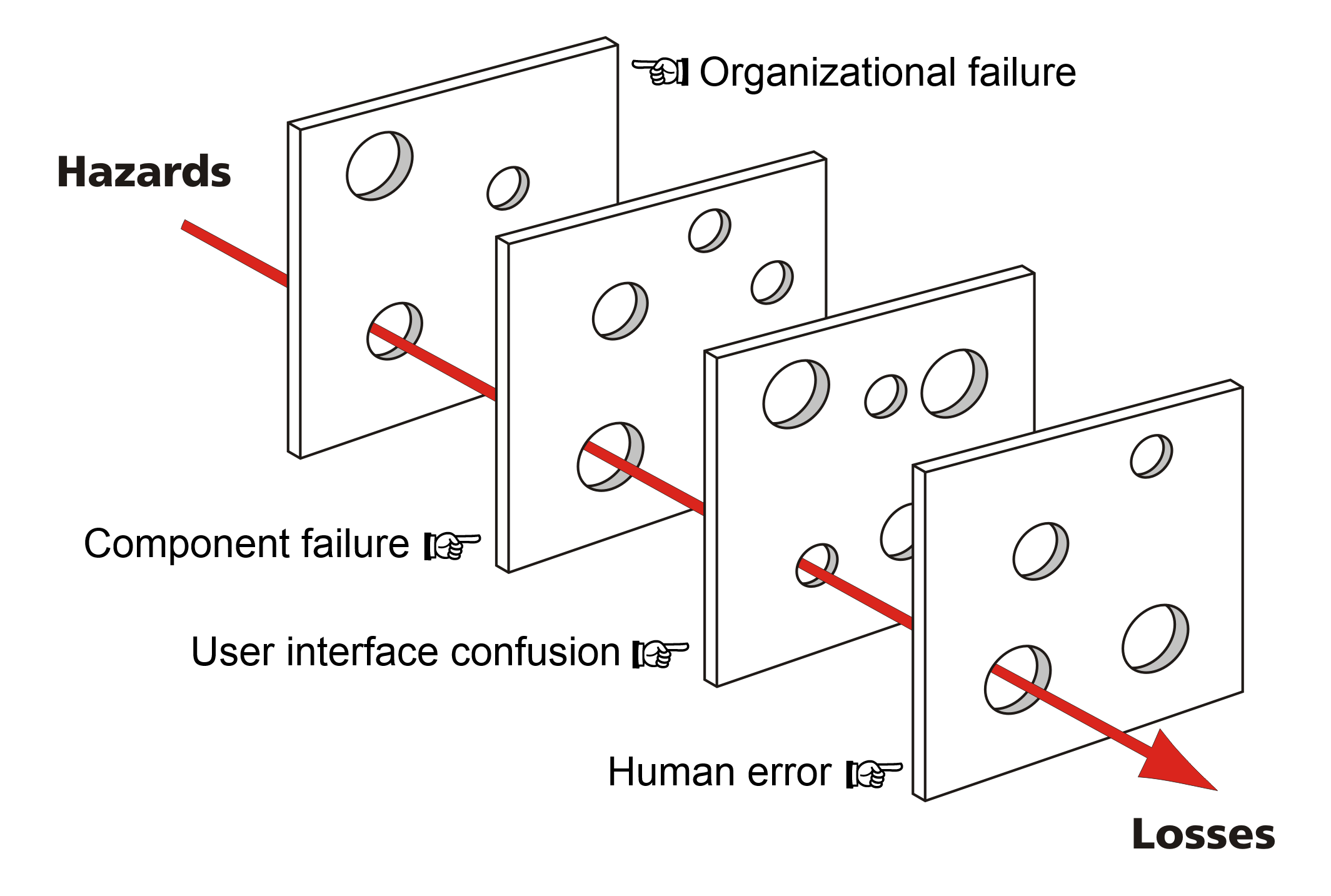
Swiss cheese model of accident causation

== See also ==
- Accident classification
- Crew resource management
- National Fire Fighter Near-Miss Reporting System
- SHELL model
- Human reliability
