= Vertical Aviation Safety Team =

- Abbreviation: VAST
- Formation: 2021
- Type: Aviation safety partnership
- Purpose: Safety promotion and risk reduction for vertical aviation (rotorcraft and other VTOL operations)
- Region served: Worldwide
- Website: vast.aero

The Vertical Aviation Safety Team (VAST) is an international public–private aviation safety partnership focused on improving safety in vertical aviation, including rotorcraft and other vertical take-off and landing (VTOL) operations. It was launched in 2021 as a successor to earlier international helicopter safety collaboration efforts, with an expanded scope that also anticipates the growth of new VTOL operations. VAST coordinates safety promotion and information-sharing among regional safety teams, aviation authorities, and industry stakeholders.

== Background ==
Aviation industry reporting described VAST as a new international safety organization for the vertical takeoff and landing sector, with a stated goal of reducing fatal accidents through coordinated safety initiatives. The FAA has described VAST as succeeding earlier helicopter-focused international collaboration and broadening the scope to vertical aviation safety promotion and operational risk reduction.

== Structure and participation ==
VAST’s charter describes it as a public–private initiative with participation from regional safety teams, safety authorities (including civil aviation authorities), and other industry stakeholders such as manufacturers, operators, training providers, and associations. The charter describes an advisor structure, a steering committee, and standing working groups that support safety promotion and other safety projects.

== Regional safety teams ==
VAST is structured around cooperation among regional safety teams operating in different jurisdictions.

=== Europe ===
European Union Aviation Safety Agency (EASA) materials describe the European Safety Promotion Network Rotorcraft (ESPN-R) as the European regional team of VAST, created in 2021 as part of an expanded rotorcraft/vertical aviation safety promotion approach.

=== United States ===
The FAA has identified the United States Helicopter Safety Team (USHST) as one of VAST’s regional chapters and described USHST’s use of a “Helicopter Safety Enhancements” (H-SEs) framework to promote rotorcraft safety improvements. In 2022 safety recommendation correspondence, the U.S. National Transportation Safety Board (NTSB) referred to VAST “of which USHST is a member” in the context of safety-technology adoption and VAST work on a proposed helicopter safety rating system.

== Activities ==
=== Safety promotion ===
An ICAO EUR Regional Aviation Safety Plan (RASP) action for rotorcraft operations has described development of safety promotion material “in cooperation with” VAST (noted as previously ‘IHSF’), including material addressing topics such as performance-based navigation, point-in-space operations and low-level IFR concepts for rotorcraft operations.

=== Conferences and outreach ===
Aviation reporting has described VAST’s “Global Conference” programming as focused on vertical lift safety, including discussion of VTOL operations as part of a broadened scope.

=== Helicopter safety rating work ===
The NTSB has described a VAST special projects working group, “Safety Rating for Helicopters,” as developing a worldwide voluntary safety rating scheme intended to increase awareness of available helicopter safety enhancements, including technologies beyond the certification basis of a helicopter. Aviation reporting has also covered the VAST effort to explore a voluntary helicopter safety rating system as a means to encourage adoption of safety equipment and accident-prevention technologies.

== See also ==
- United States Helicopter Safety Team
- European Safety Promotion Network Rotorcraft
