= U.S. Helicopter Safety Team =

United States Helicopter Safety Team - USHST
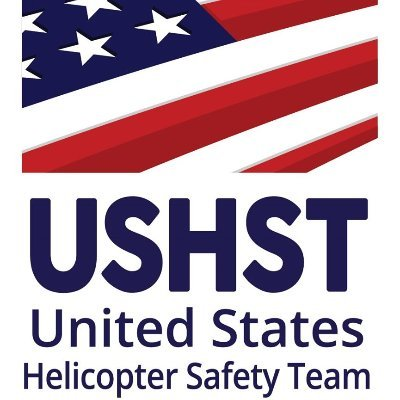
- Type: Government–industry aviation safety partnership
- Industry: Aviation Safety
- Founded: 2005 (International Helicopter Safety Team - IHST)
- Founder: American Helicopter Society International and Helicopter Association International
- Headquarters: Washington DC, U.S.
- Area served: United States
- Key people: Industry Co-Chairman, Chris Baur, FRAeS (CEO, Hughes Aerospace Corp) Government Co-Chairman Robert Reckert (FAA) Steering Committee, Chris Hill (VAI)
- Services: Safety education, accident prevention, data analysis, peer pilot support, and industry outreach
- Website: www.ushst.org

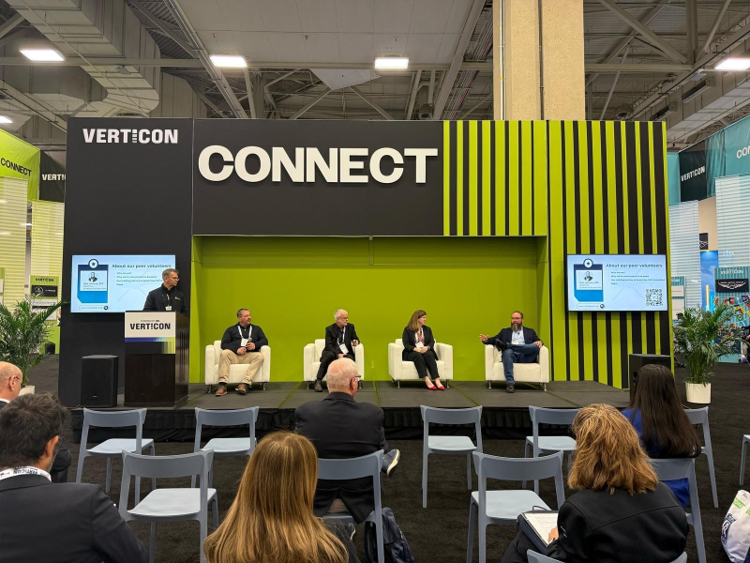
Launch of the United States Helicopter Safety Team (USHST) Peer Pilot Program during VERTICON 2025 at the Kay Bailey Hutchison Convention Center in Dallas, Texas. The Peer Pilot Program is a volunteer-based peer support initiative for helicopter pilots & crew members facing personal or professional challenges.

The United States Helicopter Safety Team (USHST) is a partnership between U.S. government agencies and helicopter industry organizations formed in 2013 to reduce civil helicopter fatal accidents in the United States. The organization is co-chaired by an industry representative and a government representative appointed by the Federal Aviation Administration, which serves as the USHST's federal government partner. It is the U.S. regional partner of the Vertical Aviation Safety Team (VAST), an international vertical aviation safety initiative.

== History ==
The USHST traces its origins to the International Helicopter Safety Symposium held in Montreal in September 2005, where industry and government representatives agreed that helicopter accident rates had remained unacceptably high for two decades. This meeting resulted in the formation of the International Helicopter Safety Team (IHST).

In 2013, the USHST was established as the U.S. regional partner of the IHST to carry the effort forward domestically. The IHST was subsequently renamed the International Helicopter Safety Foundation (IHSF) in 2019, and in 2021 the IHSF was reorganized and expanded into the Vertical Aviation Safety Team (VAST), with the USHST continuing as a regional partner under the new structure.

In 2024, the U.S. civil helicopter industry recorded its lowest fatal accident rate per 100,000 flight hours in 25 years, according to data presented at the USHST's annual all-hands meeting.

== Programs ==
The USHST has developed a series of Helicopter Safety Enhancements (H-SEs), safety initiatives that address the leading causes of fatal helicopter accidents, including loss of control, unintentional flight into instrument meteorological conditions, and low-altitude operations.

== See also ==
- Federal Aviation Administration
- Vertical Aviation Safety Team
- Helicopter Association International
