= Investigation of diving accidents =

Forensic investigation of underwater diving accidents

Investigation of diving accidents includes investigations into the causes of reportable incidents in professional diving and recreational diving accidents, usually when there is a fatality or litigation for gross negligence.

An investigation of some kind usually follows a fatal diving accident, or one in which litigation is expected. There may be several investigations with different agendas. If police are involved, they generally look for evidence of a crime. In the U.S., the United States Coast Guard will usually investigate if there is a death when diving from a vessel in coastal waters. Health and safety administration officials may investigate when the diver was injured or killed at work. When a death occurs during an organised recreational activity, the certification agency's insurers will usually send an investigator to look into possible liability issues. The investigation may occur almost immediately to some considerable time after the event. In most cases the body will have been recovered and resuscitation attempted, and in this process equipment is usually removed and may be damaged or lost, or the evidence compromised by handling. Witnesses may have dispersed, and equipment is often mishandled by the investigating authorities if they are unfamiliar with the equipment and store it improperly, which can destroy evidence and compromise findings.

Recreational diving accidents are usually relatively uncomplicated, but accidents involving an extended range environment or specialised equipment may require expertise beyond the experience of any one investigator. This is a particular issue when rebreather equipment is involved. Investigators who are not familiar with complex equipment may not know enough about the equipment to understand that they do not know enough.

For every incident in which someone is injured or killed, it has been estimated that a relatively large number of "near miss" incidents occur, which the diver manages well enough to avoid harm. Ideally these will be recorded, analysed for cause, reported, and the results made public, so that similar incidents can be avoided in the future.

== Reasons for investigation ==
Professional diving accidents are usually investigated when a reportable injury occurs in terms of occupational health and safety legislation. The purpose is generally to allow avoidance of recurrences of the circumstances leading to the incident if practicable, and where relevant, to establish whether there was fault attributable to any involved party, which could lead to criminal or civil charges.

Accident investigation may help to identify the cause of a specific accident. If a pattern can be identified this may inform procedures and legislation to reduce the risk of the same pattern of accident recurring in the future. An investigation may identify shortcomings in training or procedures, or problems with equipment. Fatalities are often investigated as potential crimes until the cause of death has been identified. Insurance claims may rely on information from an investigation to establish whether the accident is covered by a policy. Occupational health and safety inspectors may investigate an occupational diving incident to identify whether regulations have been violated. Civil litigation for claimed damages can be more equitably decided when the circumstances leading to the injury have been identified. The ability to provide documentary evidence showing that correct procedure was followed can simplify the investigation and may lead to more accurate and reliable findings.

Equipment, procedures, organization, environment, individual factors and interactions between them are the sources of contributing and compounding events and conditions. Analysis of near accidents can be of great value to identify sources of error and allow planning to reduce or eliminate contributing and compounding conditions. A safety study estimated about a million shortcuts taken per fatal accident.

Accident investigations typically focus on the end event, and attempt to erect barriers to similar accidents, such as personal protection equipment, backup equipment or alarm systems. These are intended to prevent the recurrence of similar accidents, and are often effective in this limited goal. Accidents continue to occur because the majority of the contributing and compounding factors are not addressed. Human behavior and the systems in which people work are too complex to analyse all possible interactions. A more effective route to accident prevention is to reduce or mitigate the occurrence of human error by focusing on the contributing and compounding human factors that create an environment in which accidents are likely to occur.

== General procedures ==
The victims of diving accidents are generally recovered or rescued by other divers in the vicinity. It is unusual for a diver to be left underwater with no immediate attempt at recovery, so in situ forensic investigation is seldom applicable, and the investigation usually relies on the accounts of witnesses. Different people may make different reports and develop different opinions about what happened. It is not unusual for people with less knowledge and understanding to misinterpret what they have seen and investigators need to gather as much information as reasonably possible to improve the chance of getting accurate information.

Recommended autopsy procedures have been summarised by specialists in diving fatality investigations and are available as guidelines to reduce the risk of overlooking pertinent evidence by pathologists less experienced in diving related autopsies.

There are three parts to a fatal accident investigation.

- Autopsy to determine where possible any medical factors that may have caused or contributed towards the death,
- Investigation of the sequence of events to determine whether any procedural or behavioural issues caused or contributed towards the death. This is usually done through witness interviews and looking into the deceased's history of training and experience, and
- Inspection and testing of the equipment used by the deceased, to find out if any equipment problems, defects, or malfunctions were contributory.

Most marine incident emergency response and accident investigation protocols have been written to manage surface incidents. These protocols are often inadequate for discovering the facts that could improve diving safety, and there is often a lack of cooperation between investigators and stakeholders in the outcomes of investigations.

It is not usually necessary to dive to inspect the site of a diving accident, but sometimes there are unusual environmental features which make underwater inspection desirable.

=== Recreational diving accidents ===
A large proportion of recreational divers use a personal decompression computer to monitor depth, time and decompression status. These generally log a dive profile by recording depth and time at regular intervals, and this data can usually be downloaded or inspected on the instrument. This usually constitutes a reliable and objective record of the actual dive profile, and is normally admissible as evidence. Accuracy may vary depending on calibration. In some cases assistance from the factory may be needed to recover the data. Similar, often more detailed information may be recorded by the electronic control system of a rebreather.

to be expanded

=== Professional diving accidents ===
There will generally be regulatory requirements regarding both the performance and record keeping for a professional dive, and these may vary in detail depending on the jurisdiction. Where diving falls under occupational health and safety legislation any accident occurring at work may be investigated by the responsible OHS organisation, and if criminal activity is suspected, also by the police. The regulations will probably require a documentary record of the risk assessment associated with the dive, a documented dive plan for the specific dive, an operations manual specifying the accepted equipment and procedures, checklists for preparation and pre-dive checks, and a record of the timeline and depths of the diving operation in the diving operations log. All of these may be considered legal documents and evidence, but there is no guarantee that they will have been followed, and this should be checked by looking for corroborative evidence. In some jurisdictions, some forms of professional diving may be covered by different regulations, exemptions or conditional exemptions.

Professional diving on scuba also frequently uses dive computers as dive profile recorders. The data logged by the computer can be useful in determining the details of the dive profile and interpreting the sequence of events, particularly where there is no communications recording available. Similar, often more detailed information may be recorded by the electronic control system of a rebreather.

==== Commercial diving accidents ====
Surface supplied diving usually uses a diver intercom system to provide voice communications between the diver and supervisor, both for management and control of the dive, and for safety, as the supervisor can monitor the condition of the diver by hearing the breathing sounds. It is standard procedure for many (possibly most) contractors to record the voice communications of the dive and retain them for at least 24 hours, or longer in the case of an incident. These recordings are usually available as evidence in an official investigation. Surface supplied divers do not generally carry personal decompression computers, as depth profile is monitored from the surface, and decompression is controlled by the supervisor, who will log changes in depth as and when they occur.

== Preservation and disclosure of evidence ==
Failure to identify, preserve, and produce critical evidence such as dive computer data can result in sanctions against the responsible party, including findings in favour of the party requesting the lost information. Investigators without a sufficient knowledge of diving equipment have been known to destroy or lose critical evidence through mishandling of equipment, even when it survived rescue and recovery efforts.

In US Federal law the owner of equipment that logs data during an incident that may be the subject of litigation is obliged to preserve that data and make it available as evidence if the case comes to court at a later date. Litigants are required to find out what they have and disclose everything relevant to the opposition.

Detailed checklists and standardised report formats have been developed for use by investigators to minimise the risk of missing important evidence and of compromising the evidence. These are available for open-circuit and rebreather equipment.

=== Special procedures for rebreather equipment ===
Although all cases where a diver dies while wearing a rebreather are classified as rebreather fatalities, this does not necessarily mean that a rebreather equipment problem was a contributory factor to the death of the diver. Not much is known about the root causes of these accidents because many investigations were inadequate and such findings as exist are often not made public. This makes it difficult to objectively improve the equipment, procedures and training so that the faults and errors are not repeated.

The most common equipment tests in rebreather incidents include examination of the equipment, scrubber testing, oxygen consumption tests, work of breathing measurements, checks on electronics and sensors, and tests of modifications where present. Equipment problems are the trigger for a large percentage of incidents, though equipment failures are less common. Procedural and human-machine interactions are a significant factor in rebreather incidents, and more common than in open circuit diving.

In the European Union, breathing apparatus for underwater use is a category III product, meaning that failures are potentially lethal. The harmonised standard for diving rebreathers is EN 14143-2003, so rebreathers will be checked against that standard.

The appropriate tests depend on the condition of the unit and the specifics of the case. As a general rule the first items are to download the logs from dive computers and breathing apparatus following the manufacturer's specifications. The assembled rebreather's exterior is checked and photographed, and the gas content of the counterlung is sampled and analyzed. Although there are many possibilities for the counterlung gas to mix with the surroundings, a finding of a low oxygen content may indicate hypoxia if there is no evidence of an alternative cause of low oxygen levels. The content of the cylinders is also measured and analysed and the cylinders, regulator and check valves inspected. The work of breathing is measured on the appropriate equipment.

The unit is dismantled and the sensors, electronics and battery are tested, and the scrubber inspected. After cleaning, disinfecting and reassembly, the unit is test dived, in case there is some subtle problem that can be detected by an expert user, such as buoyancy, weight distribution and performance in various orientations. Ergonomics and performance implications of any customisation will be checked. All results are recorded, and photographs taken at various stages of the procedures.

== Causes of diving accidents ==
Causes of diving accidents are the triggering events that when combined with inadequate response, lead to an adverse consequence which may be classified as a notifiable incident or an accident when injury or death follows. These causes can be categorised as human factors, equipment problems and environmental factors. Equipment problems and environmental factors are also often influenced by human error.

The risk of injury varies with the mode and classification of the dive. In recreational diving it is generally possible for a diver to make several errors of judgement or calculation without adverse effects. More technical dive profiles may be less tolerant of error to the extent that a single error may be life-threatening, so technical divers tend to carry and use equipment to mitigate such possible errors, and to use and practice procedures known to reduce the risk of committing such errors. Professional diving is generally required to have a risk as low as reasonably practicable, and this implies the use of equipment redundancy, procedures known to minimise risk, and the availability of support personnel and equipment on site to mitigate reasonably foreseeable incidents.

=== Human factors ===
Human error is inevitable and everyone makes mistakes at some time. The consequences of these errors are varied and depend on many factors. Most errors are minor and do not cause significant harm, but others can have catastrophic consequences. Examples of human error leading to accidents are available in vast numbers, as it is the direct cause of 60% to 80% of all accidents. Inexperience and lack of competence are the commonest root causes of diving fatalities. Inattention and negligence are known to be common contributory factors in diving accidents, and have been the root cause of some accidents.

==== Physiological factors ====
A wide range of physiological factors may trigger or contribute towards a diving accident. The causes of death or serious injury in diving accidents include drowning, lung overpressure accidents, decompression sickness, carbon monoxide poisoning and trauma due to impact with boats. These are usually the final effect and may be combined, though the usually the cause of death is attributed to just one of the causes. Acute oxygen toxicity, hypoxia, hypothermia and squeezes (barotrauma) may also be primary causes of diving accidents.

Physiological triggering events that may lead to a diving accident, but are not generally the direct cause of death include nitrogen narcosis, dehydration, exhaustion, hypothermia, excessive work of breathing, motion sickness and the effects of alcohol and recreational drugs. Occasionally side effects of medical pharmaceuticals may also trigger an accident. Epileptic seizures should not occur, as a history of epilepsy is a bar to diver training, but cases have occurred where the problem was not disclosed and the person subsequently died as a result of drowning after losing their air supply during a seizure. These factors are often overlooked in accident investigations, and this may lead to a misleading conclusion about the cause of death.

Problems not directly related to diving may also cause death while diving, such as a cardiac event or stroke, possibly triggered by the physical effort of a difficult situation. These causes may be overlooked and the death inaccurately ascribed to drowning.

Drowning may be the most common reported cause of death in diving incidents. However, an autopsy listing drowning as the cause of death may not have established the reason for drowning, and autopsies on diving accident victims require a specific set of procedures to detect evidence of other possible causes. Drowning has been reported as the default finding in water related deaths where other causes were not detected, and may be erroneous. A properly equipped diver following recommended practices, diving in an environment compatible with their competence and in good health should not drown. When drowning is the direct cause of death it has usually been the final stage of a cascade of incidents which at some stage got out of the diver's control and culminated in drowning. The sequence of events is relatively difficult to establish and requires an understanding and familiarity with the equipment and procedures which may not be known to the investigators. This lack of clarity can lead to inappropriate litigation.

==== Psychological factors ====
In a high risk environment, as is the case in diving, human error is more likely to have catastrophic consequences. A study by William P. Morgan indicates that over half of all divers in the survey had experienced panic underwater at some time during their diving career. These findings were independently corroborated by a survey that suggested 65% of recreational divers have panicked under water. Panic frequently leads to errors in a diver's judgment or performance, and may result in an accident. Human error and panic are considered to be the leading causes of dive accidents and fatalities.

==== Procedural factors ====
Only 4.46% of the recreational diving fatalities in a 1997 study were attributable to a single contributory cause. The remaining fatalities probably arose as a result of a progressive sequence of events involving two or more procedural errors or equipment failures, and procedural errors are generally avoidable by a well-trained, intelligent and alert diver, working in an organised structure, and not under excessive stress.

=== Equipment issues ===
Most diving equipment is quite rugged and very reliable when correctly maintained and tested before use, but almost anything can fail and cause a problem for the diver. Some failures are merely an inconvenience, but others can be immediately life-threatening, so part of diver training is how to manage those failures which constitute an immediate risk to health or life. These are generally failures affecting breathing gas supply and buoyancy. Failures of environmental protection are generally not immediately life-threatening to recreational divers, who are able to abort a dive and surface at any time, but are more serious for divers with decompression obligations, or are unable to surface because of a physical overhead barrier, or dive in extremely cold or polluted water. Loss of buoyancy is less of a problem to surface supplied divers as they have a lifeline and do not easily run out of gas, but an uncontrolled ascent can be dangerous even when there is technically no decompression obligation. For a scuba diver, loss of breathing gas and buoyancy together can be deadly.

==== Out of gas incidents ====
A high proportion of scuba accidents involve running out of breathing gas. However, in the majority of these cases there is no equipment failure, or a minor equipment failure is mismanaged. Out of gas incidents are immediately life-threatening underwater, and all divers are trained in mitigation procedures. Recreational divers who rely on a dive buddy to supply gas in an emergency are expected to carry a secondary demand valve and remain close enough to their buddy to provide gas without delay in an emergency. Alternatives to gas sharing are to make an emergency ascent to the surface, a procedure implicated in a large proportion of fatalities, or to carry an independent alternative gas supply. Solo and rebreather divers follow this latter strategy, and technical divers may choose to carry bailout gas or use a scuba configuration that reduces the risk of a complete loss of gas in the event of most scenarios, at the cost of greater skill requirements and task loading. Professional scuba divers may be required to carry bailout gas.

The submersible pressure gauge is extremely reliable, and seldom fails catastrophically without warning, though they can be inaccurate at low pressures. Occasionally a hose bursts due to immediate or accumulated damage, and a low pressure hose burst can empty a cylinder in a few minutes to seconds depending on the contents of the cylinder, while also making the remaining gas unavailable to the diver. Unrecoverable free-flows are rare, but occasionally occur, and regulator freeze can cause a free-flow which can only be stopped by closing the cylinder valve. More commonly, a diver will use up all the gas without noticing until the pressure is critically low. A common complication of loss of breathing gas supply is that the same gas supply is routinely used for breathing and buoyancy control in recreational scuba diving.

Surface supplied divers are generally obliged to carry sufficient bailout gas to return to a place of safety if the main gas supply fails, and this is usually activated by opening a valve on the helmet or harness that is in easy reach of both hands. Unsurprisingly, the number of out of gas fatalities in surface supplied diving is very low.

==== Breathing gas quality problems ====
Contamination of the breathing gas will have effects that depend on the concentration, the ambient pressure, and the specific contaminants present. Carbon monoxide produced by overheating of the compressor, or by contamination of the intake air by internal combustion engine exhaust gas is a well known risk, and can be mitigated by using hopcalite catalyst in the high pressure filter. Contamination by carbon dioxide is unusual in open circuit breathing apparatus, as natural air usually has a low enough content not to be a problem at the ambient pressures of most dives. It is a relatively common problem for rebreathers, as the metabolically produced carbon dioxide in the exhaled gas must be removed chemically by the scrubber before the gas can be breathed again. Scrubber breakthrough can occur for a variety of reasons, most of them connected to user error, but some more likely due to design details of the specific unit. A slow buildup of carbon dioxide can usually be noticed by the diver in time to bail out, but sometimes the concentration can rise so rapidly that the diver is incapacitated before being able to bail out.

Use of breathing gases other than those planned for the current depth range of a dive can have undesirable consequences. The oxygen concentration of a gas may be toxic or insufficient to support consciousness if used at an inappropriate depth, and the inert gas components will not be correctly accounted for in decompression calculations, which might result in decompression sickness. Both oxygen toxicity and hypoxia may render the diver unconscious without warning, and decompression sickness symptoms may be debilitating if severe, and are generally unexpected.

==== Breathing apparatus malfunctions ====
Open circuit scuba is generally very reliable if correctly maintained and serviced, and tested before the dive. Maintenance and testing procedures are simple and few in number, nevertheless divers may neglect them due to complacency, distraction or incompetence.

Rebreather scuba is considerably more complex than open circuit scuba, and the number of failure modes is much greater. The complexity of routine maintenance, pre-dive setup and pre-dive testing are such that documentary checklists specific to the equipment model are strongly recommended by experts. Electronically mediated predive check sequences are available on some electronic closed circuit rebreathers, but even these occasionally fail to detect a latent problem.

Surface supplied diving equipment may provide a constant flow or demand regulated gas supply. The surface gas control panel allows alternative gas supplies to be connected if the primary supply fails, and a further backup supply is generally carried by the diver. This multiple redundancy reduces the number of ways the gas supply to the diver can be critically compromised, and further mitigation is provided by the standby diver, who can also supply emergency breathing gas. As a consequence, surface-supplied divers are very seldom critically affected by breathing gas supply failure.

==== Buoyancy problems ====
Insufficient buoyancy is a problem for divers who must ascend through the water column without assistance from a lifting platform, a surface tender, or something they can climb. This effectively limits the problem to freedivers and untethered scuba divers. Insufficient buoyancy at the end of a dive can prevent the diver from surfacing before breathing gas runs out, cause the diver to sink to an unintended depth or cause a diver at the surface to be unable to stay afloat. Insufficient buoyancy at the end of a dive is usually due to diver error in carrying too much weight or to a major failure of the dry suit or buoyancy compensator (BC or BCD). Insufficient buoyancy at the start of a dive can also be caused by carrying too much weight, but can also be due to a poor match between mass of gas carried and volume of buoyancy compensator, which is usually only a problem with technical divers, who may start a dive with a relatively large mass of gas. A major flood of the dry suit can cause a sudden large loss of buoyancy at any time during a dive. A properly trained and equipped diver will be able to correct this either by BC inflation or weight shedding. Divers are trained to manage problems of insufficient buoyancy due to equipment malfunctions, and to adjust their weighting to suit the equipment used for a specific dive. The consequence of uncompensated insufficient buoyancy is usually drowning. Almost all fatalities due to insufficient buoyancy can be ascribed to diver error if the diver was conscious and able to act at the time that the problem was noticed.

Excessive buoyancy can be a problem for any diver who is constrained from making a direct uncontrolled ascent. It is a hazard for all divers who breath underwater at ambient pressure, as a rapid ascent can cause decompression illness. Excessive buoyancy at the start of a dive is usually caused by insufficient weighting, which is diver error. Loss of ballast weights can occur at any time during a dive, and can have various causes, depending on how the weights are carried, including voluntary shedding of too much weight in a perceived emergency. A third cause of excessive buoyancy, which develops during a dive and usually manifests at the end, during the ascent, is insufficient weighting to compensate for the mass of gas used during the dive. This can be almost always be ascribed to diver error, and usually occurs when a diver miscalculates the buoyancy increase due to gas usage, and does not carry sufficient weight to compensate. It is a common problem when unfamiliar equipment is used without a checkout dive with the cylinder nearly empty. Divers will often accept the recommendations for weighting given by the dive shop supplying the equipment, or base their weighting on similar equipment used in the past. For recreational divers who do not exceed the no-stop limit, this is seldom seriously harmful. At worst the ascent rate may be a little fast near the surface and they will be unable to do a safety stop, but for divers with a significant decompression obligation, it can have more serious consequences. Surface supplied divers who plan a dive with long decompression obligations usually carry weights which cannot easily be removed, to reduce the risk of accidentally losing them and becoming uncontrollably buoyant. The other common cause of excessive buoyancy which can occur at any time in a dive, is excess gas in the dry suit or buoyancy compensator. This can be caused by several factors, some of which can be classed as diver error, and others as equipment malfunction, but divers are trained to deal with these malfunctions as they are reasonably foreseeable, so failure to correct them when they occur is also generally a diver error in the wider sense.

Buoyancy compensator malfunction has been implicated in a significant number of fatal incidents, usually due to a problem with the inflator mechanism, but in some cases the BCD could not stay inflated. In most of these fatalities, the buoyancy compensator was not used competently, usually by over-inflation which caused an uncontrolled ascent, or deflating when more buoyancy was required at the surface. Overweighting can also be classified as misuse of equipment. Inability to inflate the buoyancy compensator can also occur when the diver runs out of breathing gas, as the breathing gas supply is generally the inflation gas supply. This can complicate an emergency ascent, particularly if the diver is not immediately aware of the implications relating to buoyancy of breathing gas loss.

BCD blowups can occur when the inflation valve sticks open. In most cases this can be quickly corrected, either by pulling the valve closed or by disconnecting the LP inflation hose, and if the system has a low flow rate when fully open, this is seldom a major problem, as it is possible to dump air faster than it flows into the BCD. However, some inflator systems have a high flow rate, and if these valves stick fully open, the diver may not be able to dump fast enough to prevent being dragged upwards, at which stage a positive feedback of expansion of gas already in the BCD and possibly also the suit may become unrecoverable. Attempts to fin downwards against the buoyancy are likely to trap gas in the BCD and suit. Ascents are safer if the diver is trimmed feet down and shoulders high to facilitate dumping from both suit and BCD.

Double bladder BCDs are used by some technical divers as a backup in case the primary fails by not retaining air. This can happen if the inflation hose tears or comes off, or the bladder has a major puncture near the top that cannot be compensated by trim. The problem with this form of equipment redundancy occurs when the diver inadvertently inflates or deflates the wrong bladder. It is also possible for the inflation valve of a secondary bladder with low pressure inflation supply to malfunction and leak gas into the bladder without the diver's input or knowledge, and the diver then finds it impossible to dump sufficient gas from what they mistakenly believe to be the inflated bladder. This risk can be avoided by not connecting a pressure supply hose to the inflator for the secondary bladder, by having a distinctly different style of inflator mechanism, by mounting it on the other side of the diver to the primary inflator, and by never using it underwater while the primary bladder is functional. The other way of managing this problem is to mount the two inflator valve units together, and basically always assume that both bladders have gas in then, so always dump from both at the same time. This may be problematic if the diver needs to deflate while inverted and the lower dump valves are not positioned to allow simultaneous operation.

If a dry suit is worn, the dry suit can be inflated as a substitute for the BCD in an emergency, but a dry suit is not well suited to operate at a good trim with a large amount of gas inside, and the risk of a runaway inverted ascent is significant. Remaining upright and ascending without delay is most likely to avoid complications.

Divers who carry a delayed surface marker buoy (DSMB) can use it to signal the surface that they are ascending, and use it to positively control depth and ascent rate once deployed, by maintaining some tension in the line. The equipment is considered an important safety aid, but deployment is a period of relatively high risk, as if the line snags and stops unrolling the buoyancy may be sufficient to drag the diver up far enough to cause the expansion of the suit and BCD to get out of control, and if the diver lets go of the DSMB it will be lost. A spare DSMB and spool may be carried in case of this contingency. The risks of deploying the DSMB with the reel clipped to the diver are considered unacceptable by some, and this practice has been implicated in fatal accidents.

==== Thermal problems ====
- Hypothermia
- Overheating (hyperthermia) is a less common problem, and is usually associated with special environments. It can be particularly problematic as the physiological response to overheating of sweating does not work in water or a diving suit where relative humidity rapidly reaches 100% and there can be no evaporative cooling. Hyperthermia can simply be avoided by recreational divers in almost all circumstances, as water temperature is normally known before entry, but professional divers may have work in water which is too hot to operate without artificial cooling. In some cases this can be done simply by running cooling water through a hot-water suit, but the situation can be complicated when the diver must also be isolated from environmental contamination. Cooling vests and "tube suits" have been used for this application.
  - Scalding in hot water suits

==== Hazardous tools and activities ====
Underwater cutting and welding activities involve the use of live electrical conductors exposed to the water in the close proximity of the diver using them. Electrocution is possible, though unlikely to be fatal. as the voltages are fairly low. They also involve extreme heat and the generation of explosive gases, which may accumulate under obstacles to their free escape, and may detonate, causing pressure trauma to the diver. Stringent precautions are required for using this equipment, including training in the appropriate procedures. Nevertheless, accidents occasionally happen. The equipment used and injuries manifested are pointers towards possible triggering events.

Professional divers are often required to assist with the lifting and placement of large, massive objects underwater during the course of their employment. This exposes them to hazards of impact, pinching and crushing. Trauma caused by such incidents is usually obvious and easily identified. In some cases the triggering incident is a lapse of procedure, other times it may be an unexpected environmental effect, though seldom unforeseeable. Occasionally a failure of properly tested, inspected and operated equipment may occur. Negligence is often contributory to such accidents. Recreational divers are usually not sufficiently trained to safely perform these tasks, and are at greater risk. Entanglement in a runaway buoyant lift is a hazard specifically of working with lift bags, and particularly when filling them with breathing gas from scuba cylinders carried by the diver. Filling a lift bag at depth can deplete the gas supply in a cylinder rapidly, so a dedicated cylinder should be used when this work must be done on scuba.

High pressure water-jetting injuries are usually easy to recognise. Investigation of incidents involving such injuries is likely to include identifying procedural causes, or occasionally equipment malfunction, which may also have a procedural cause.

Explosives are used underwater by commercial divers for demolition and to power tools to attach bolts to a structure. They may also be encountered by divers in the form of unexploded munitions of various ages and unknown stability.

=== Environmental factors ===
- Overhead environments where a direct vertical ascent to the surface is not possible. Examples include flooded caves and mines, sewers, closed tanks, culverts, penstocks and the interior of shipwrecks.
- Strong current and surge
- Pressure differentials, particularly when they cause flow towards an enclosed space or mechanical hazard. A pressure difference can draw a diver into a hazard, or trap the diver against an opening too small to pass through. In extreme cases the pressure difference across a small opening can cause direct trauma.
- Entrapment hazards
- Hazardous materials

== Autopsy findings ==
Drowning is death resulting from hypoxemia caused by asphyxiation by immersion in a liquid. It is very often the direct cause of death in diving accidents, but usually follows a series of events triggered by an event which need not necessarily have been fatal. Drowning is a diagnosis of exclusion, it is appropriate when other possibilities have been ruled out. In scuba diving drowning is usually the consequence of running out of breathing gas at depth or under an overhead barrier to a direct ascent to the surface, but can also occur as a consequence of loss of consciousness for any one of a variety of reasons followed by a compromised airway. In breath-hold diving, it usually occurs when the diver loses consciousness or reaches a state of hypercapnia severe enough to cause involuntary inhalation before reaching the surface. The airway of a surface supplied diver is usually protected by the helmet or full-face mask, and consequently these divers should survive a loss of consciousness if rescued while a suitable breathing gas supply is available.

Arterial gas embolism requires overextension and rupture of lung tissue, which in a healthy diver, can occur on ascent. A sufficient overexpansion of the lungs requires a simultaneous decrease in depth and failure to release gas from the lungs, so that the blood-air interface is ruptured while there is sufficient overpressure to force gas into pulmonary blood vessels against local blood pressure It can also be caused by some lung pathologies.

Decompression sickness requires supersaturation of tissues during the decompression of ascent, and bubble formation is affected by ascent rate and the amount of gas dissolved in the tissues during exposure to pressure while breathing. Presence of tissue bubbles during autopsy is not necessarily an indication of DCS as gas will come out of solution when a body is decompressed by recovering to the surface. Dive history as recorded by a personal dive computer or bottom timer can indicate a probability of gas bubbles being a consequence of decompression sickness, lung overpressure induced arterial gas embolism or an artifact of post mortem recovery decompression.

Paradoxical gas embolism – venous blood with bubbles which would be asymptomatic if filtered through the pulmonary circulation passing through a patent foramen ovale into the systemic circulation during exertion during ascent or after surfacing, and then lodge in critical tissues where they may grow by diffusion processes. Divers are often unaware of a PFO, and there is not generally a requirement to be tested for PFO for recreational or professional divers as it is not a disqualification for diving.

Cardiovascular disease: The most common natural disease process associated with diving fatalities. Often sudden death is the first indication of cardiovascular disease, but sometimes the diver had known problems but chose to continue diving. In divers older than 35 years cardiovascular disease is second only to drowning as the primary cause of death, and is frequently implicated in drownings.

Carbon monoxide poisoning is rare, but occasionally occurs due to contaminated breathing gas. Partial pressure in the breathing gas is increased in proportion to depth, and concentrations that might be tolerated at the surface could be lethal at depth. Breathing gas tests can confirm or exclude the presence of carbon monoxide in toxic concentrations.

Mechanical trauma is usually obvious when it is the direct cause of death, but it is possible for less obvious injury to cause a short-term reduction in the level of consciousness sufficient for the diver to be unable to avoid drowning, or to hinder the diver from taking the necessary action.

== General findings ==
The direct cause of death is not usually the ultimate aim of the investigation. A finding of drowning, gas embolism or decompression sickness by the autopsy opens the question of why that happened, and whether it could or should have been avoidable. The equipment, procedures and training associated with diving are specifically intended to prevent drowning, barotrauma and decompression sickness, and a fatality caused by one of these is an indication that the system failed in some way. To be useful in preventing similar incidents, it is necessary to find out how and why the system failed. In non-fatal accidents, this is the primary purpose of the investigation.

Buddy separation is frequently associated with recreational diving incidents. This can be interpreted to indicate that the buddy system as commonly practised by recreational divers is flawed. Either the divers are not effectively adhering to the buddy system as specified by the training agencies, or the circumstances of the dive were beyond the capacity of the divers to remain together, which implies that the divers were not technically competent to perform that dive. This problem is exacerbated by arbitrary pairing of strangers to dive as buddies by dive professionals who are not familiar with the competence of the divers beyond the certification they have produced when booking the dive. The dive professionals are usually indemnified by a waiver/release that the divers are required to sign as a condition of service, leaving the divers vulnerable to the consequences of being paired with an incompetent or negligent buddy, or buddies who have been trained in slightly different procedures, and may be unfamiliar with each other's equipment and intentions. The reaction to this problem includes the two extremes – The DIR philosophy of strict adherence to a standardised system of procedures and equipment, and not diving with anyone who does not use the same system, and the self-reliant route, where the diver elects to dive as if on their own, not relying on the buddy for assistance, and carrying sufficient equipment redundancy to manage reasonably foreseeable incidents unaided. These divers may choose to dive solo rather than be burdened by a buddy of unknown competence or known incompetence, but may be obstructed in this choice by legislation or terms and conditions of service.

A common finding in recreational diving is human error, most often of the victim. In some cases the diver was not competent for the specific activity due to lack of appropriate training, in others the scope of the training was appropriate but the diver 's skills were insufficient at the time. Even when equipment problems are involved, they are usually due to human error, either by misuse, failure to check functionality, or inappropriate reaction to a problem. In professional diving, although there are considerably more safeguards required, and the incidence of accidents is lower, human error remains a major contributor, but it is sometimes error by other members of the dive team.

== Competence of investigators ==
Fatal scuba diving accidents are uncommon, fatal surface-supplied diving accidents are even less common, and training of forensic investigators and pathologists does not generally include the relevant skills and specialist knowledge. Specialist workshops have been run to provide a better understanding of diving physiology and pathophysiology, epidemiology, gathering of pertinent history, familiarization with dive equipment, modification of autopsy protocol, interpretation of the findings, and determination of the most likely cause of death.

The competence of investigators of diving accidents and incidents is usually limited to a subset of the competence to determine criminal or civil liability. This should be taken into account when presenting evidence, and investigators, expert witnesses, and the court or board of inquiry should ensure that opinions beyond the scope of their competence are specified as such so that they may be disregarded when making a judgement.

== Near miss reports ==
For every incident in which someone is injured of killed, it has been estimated that a relatively large number of "near miss" incidents occur, which the diver manages well enough to avoid harm. In many cases these can be ascribed to inherent hazards of diving, and the responses which compensated for the hazardous event are standard diving procedures, correctly and promptly applied, but there are also situations where something unforeseen, not immediately explicable, or previously considered highly improbable, occurs. Ideally these incidents will be recorded, analysed for cause, reported, and the results made public, so that similar incidents can be avoided in the future. This tends to happen more consistently in professional diving, where occupational health and safety concerns are more closely monitored, and in organisations with an established safety culture.

== See also ==
- Accident – Unforeseen event, often with a negative outcome
- Accident analysis – Process to determine the causes of accidents to prevent recurrence
- Chain of events (accident analysis) – Series of contributing factors leading to an undesired outcome
- Civil liability in recreational diving – Legal duty of care, negligence and liability in recreational diving
- Diving safety – Risk management of underwater diving activities
- Failure mode and effects analysis – Analysis of potential system failures
- Forensic science – Application of science to law and investigation
- Human factors and ergonomics
- Human reliability – Factor in safety, ergonomics and system resilience
- Incident pit – Conceptual model for explaining incident development and recovery
- Occupational safety and health – Field concerned with the safety, health and welfare of people at work
- Scuba diving fatalities – Deaths occurring while scuba diving or as a consequence of scuba diving
- Swiss cheese model – Model used in risk analysis
