= Accident =

Unforeseen event, often with a negative outcome

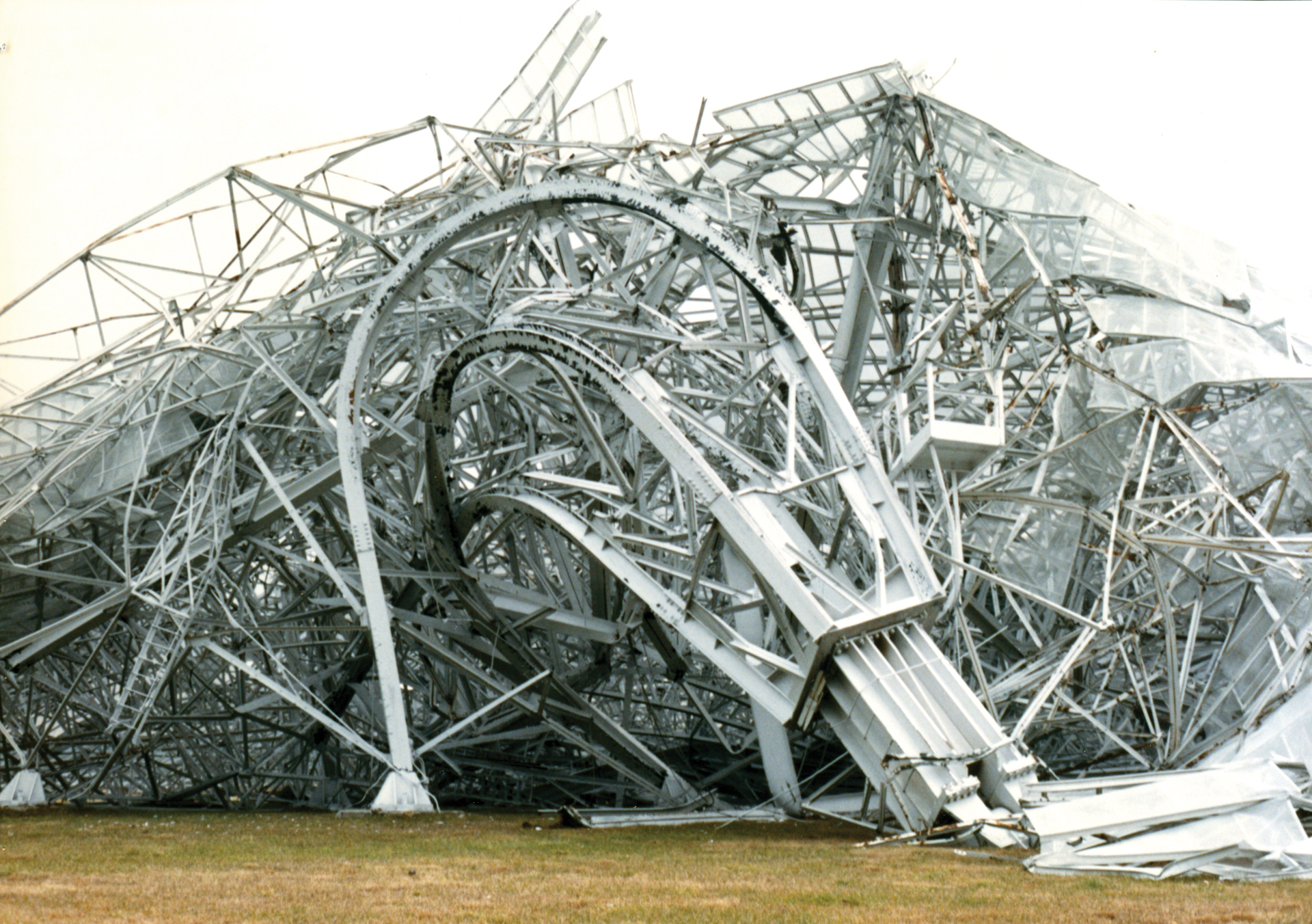
Green Bank Observatory radio telescope collapsed when a steel plate cracked in 1988.

An accident is an unintended and usually undesirable event that is not deliberately caused by humans. Although in ordinary conversations, intentionality is the only factor most people consider, formally, accidents require three factors: it must be unintended, unpreventable, and unexpected. The term accident usually implies the presence of unrecognized or unaddressed risks. Many researchers and professionals in injury prevention discourage the use of the word accident, because the word accident suggests there is no fault, no guilt, no control, and that the situation could not have been anticipated or prevented. Despite these recommendations, media reporting has been slow to change; for example, a 2025 analysis of U.S. news coverage of childhood agricultural injuries found that the term "accident" was still used in 66% of youth-related reports. Instead, experts emphasize preventable factors that increase risk and worsen outcomes. For example, while a tree falling in a windstorm may not involve human intention, factors such as its condition, placement, or maintenance may contribute to the outcome. Similarly, most road collisions stem from risky behaviour or preventable circumstances rather than being truly accidental; the perception that they are accidents rather than predictable and preventable events was strengthened in the mid-20th century due to automobile industry influence through media.

Unintentional injury deaths per million persons in 2012, reported nationally: 107–247 248–287 288–338 339–387 388–436 437–505 506–574 575–655 656–834 835–1,165

In recent years worldwide, the most common causes of accidental deaths have been road traffic incidents and falls. Writing of accidental deaths, one author says the "vast majority of accidents are not really accidents of chance, but rather accidents of folly, negligence, and blatant human misjudgment", with research showing that up to 80% of events that are called accidents are caused by human error. Many different theoretical models have been proposed for analyzing accidents, but no single model has yet proved sufficient for these often-complex events.

== Types ==
=== Physical and non-physical ===
Physical examples of accidents include unintended motor vehicle collisions, malfunctioning machinery, drowning, falling, or unintentional contact with something sharp or hot or electrified or poisonous (including drug overdoses). Unintended pregnancies and unintended scientific discoveries are also sometimes described as accidental.

Non-physical examples include unintentionally revealing a secret or otherwise saying something incorrectly, or forgetting an appointment.

=== Work and leisure ===
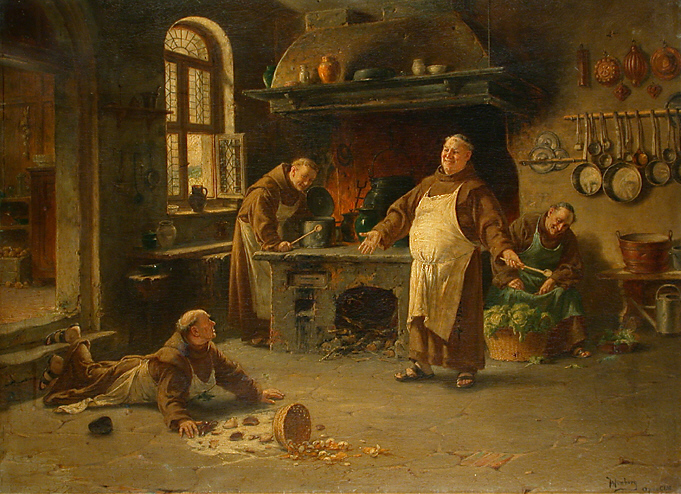
An accident in a cloister's kitchen, by Adolf Humborg

Accidents during the course of work, or arising out of it, are called work accidents, occupational accidents, or similar terms. According to the International Labour Organization, approximately 400 million accidents happen on the job each year (5% of the world population), causing more than 300,000 deaths annually (especially in mining and construction) and millions of long-term disabilities (especially back injuries).

In contrast, leisure-related accidents are mainly sports injuries, with lower fatality rates.

In process manufacturing, a primary accident (such as leakage, fire or explosion) may propagate to nearby units, resulting in an escalating chain of failure, which is often called a domino effect accident.

Commercial products sometimes emerge from accidental discoveries, famously including penicillin, Post-it notes, and microwave ovens. Injuries that occur during travel to or from employment are sometimes counted statistically as work accidents, but are usually classified separately as transportation accidents instead.

=== Transportation ===
==== Aviation ====
Peacetime aviation accidents have decreased substantially since peaking in the 1970s, despite much more air travel today.

Aviation safety has improved dramatically through decades of concerted effort. Although individual crashes can have high fatality counts and widespread publicity, modern air travel has approximately just 1 fatal crash per 16 million commercial flights (as of 2024), or 1 death per 35 billion passenger-kilometers (22 billion miles), far better than historical rates, and generally the safest way to travel a given distance over land. Airplane accidents occur most commonly during the landing process.

==== Bicycles and motorcycles ====
Unenclosed two-wheel vehicles are more economical but less visible than the much larger cars and trucks on the road, and bikes offer their riders little protection from collision or weather or hazardous road conditions. For these reasons, bicycle or motorcycle travel typically has multiple times the risk of car travel over a given distance. Electric bikes present the further risk of accidental fire from the overheating of their powerful batteries, especially from lower-quality manufacturers.

==== Maritime ====
Water transportation accidents are far too diverse for any simple generalization or statistic. Modern mega-cruise ships are akin to slow-motion cities, where accidental deaths are dwarfed by ordinary heart attacks and strokes. At the opposite extreme of size, technology, and regulation, refugee boats and whitewater kayaks are much riskier than luxury cruise ships. Ferries overloaded with impoverished crowds capsize regularly, and so do the sailboats of wealthy adventurers, and cargo ships in hazardous waters. Any attempt to summarize maritime accidents would need to recognize all these differences and more.

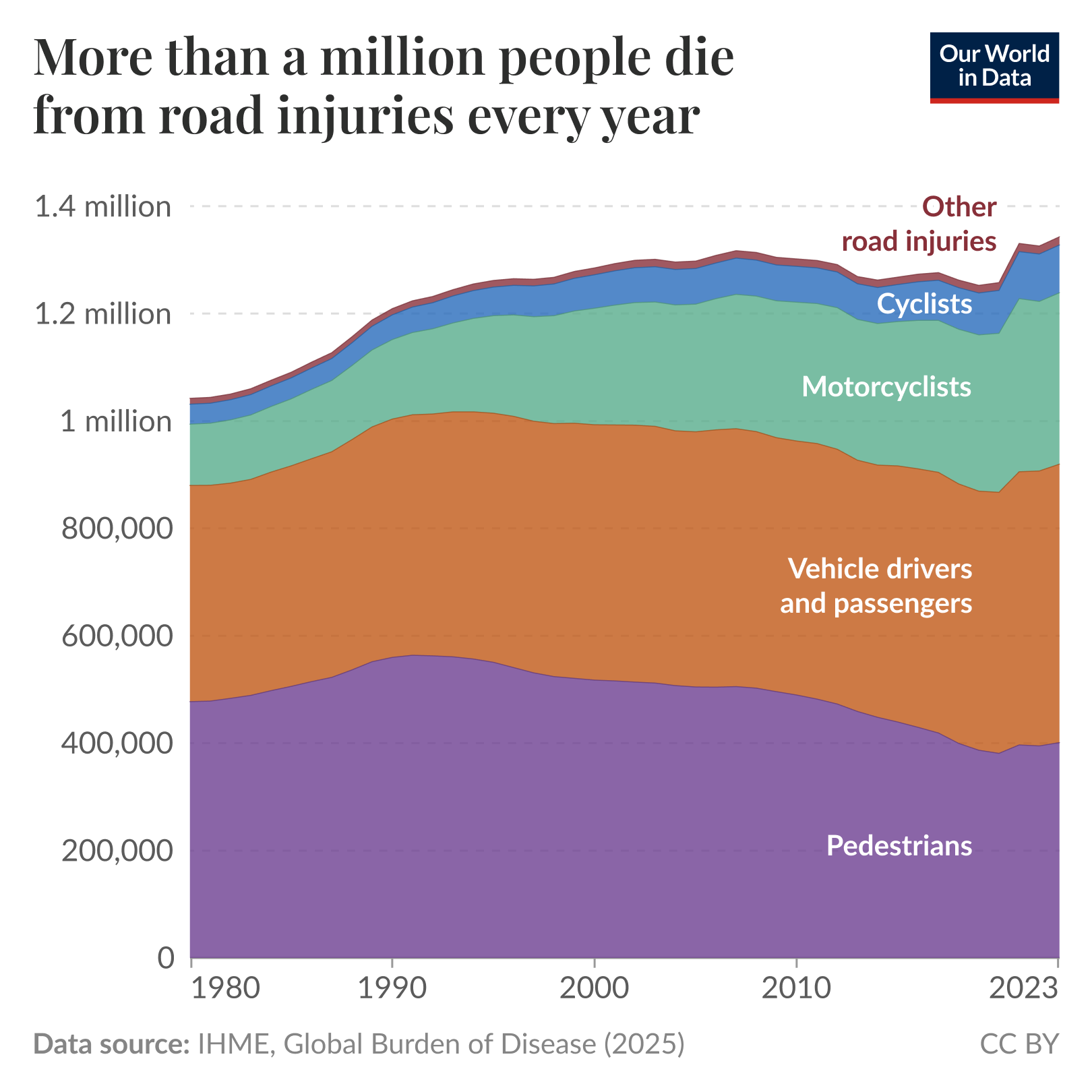
Road deaths steadily exceed 1 million per year worldwide; more than half are pedestrians, cyclists, or motorcyclists.

==== Road traffic ====
Most vehicle collisions are triggered by preventable driver behaviors such as drunk, drowsy, distracted, or dangerously fast driving, and are not true accidents in the strictest sense. The use of the word accident to describe car wrecks was promoted by the US National Automobile Chamber of Commerce in the middle of the 20th century, as a way to make vehicle-related deaths and injuries seem like an unavoidable matter of fate, rather than a problem that could be addressed by automotive safety. The automobile industry accomplished this by writing customized articles about local collisions as a free service for newspapers that used the industry's preferred language. Since 1994, the US National Highway Traffic Safety Administration has asked media and the public not to use the word accident to describe vehicle collisions.

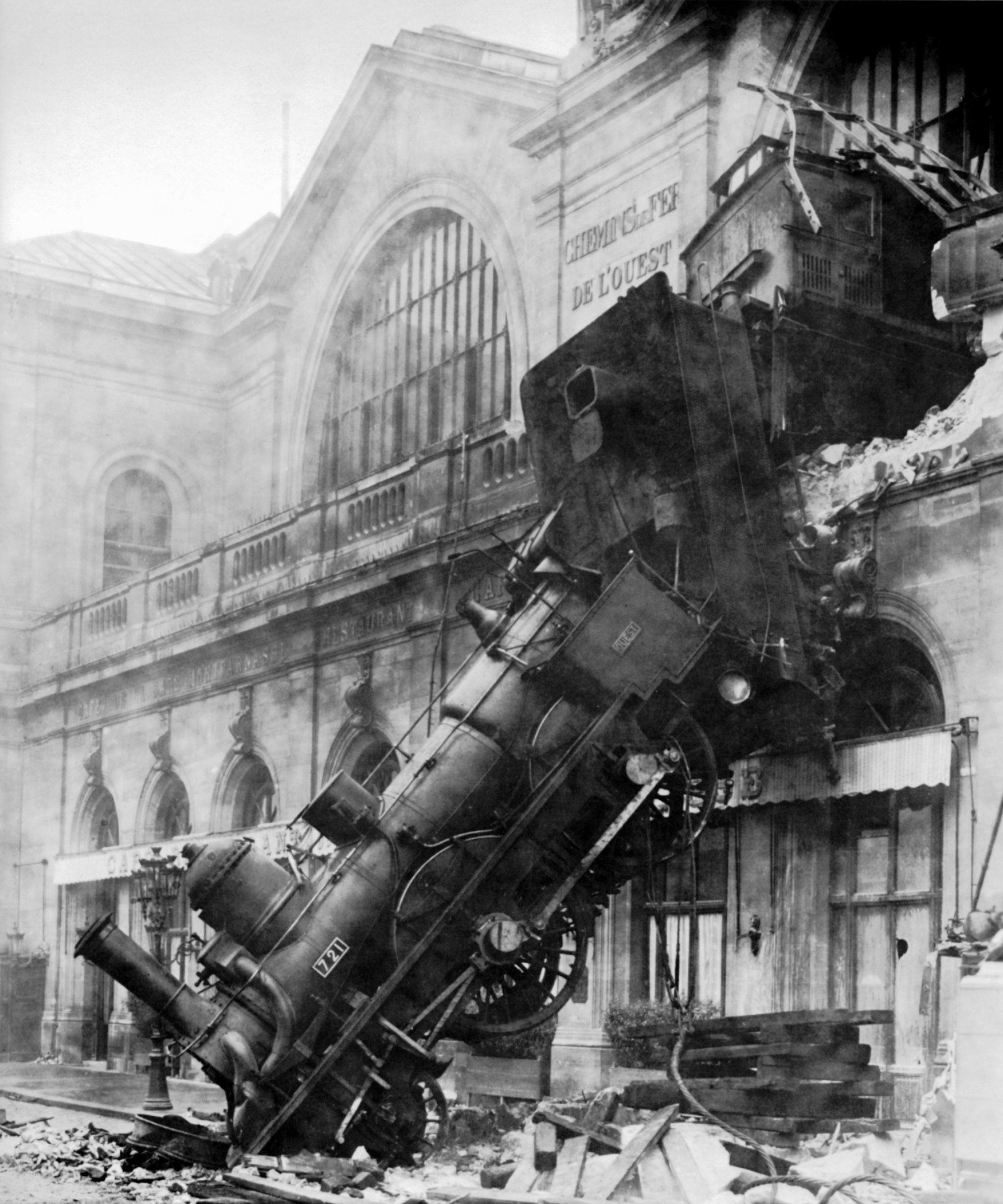
Montparnasse derailment in 1895

==== Trains ====
For a given distance, passenger trains (and also buses) are considerably safer than car traffic, although riskier than commercial aircraft. Major rail accidents can also arise from freight trains, carrying bulk quantities of hazardous cargo but few people. Unlike most other transportation accidents, a large fraction of train casualties are people out along the route, not riding on the train itself.

== Common causes ==
Rate of accidents requiring medical care, sorted by activity and age (Denmark, 2002)

According to the World Health Organization, globally more than 3 million accidental deaths occur in a typical year. The most common causes are road traffic incidents (1.2 million annual deaths, especially for young males) and falls (0.7 million annual deaths, especially for elderly females). Both fatal and nonfatal accident rates in developing countries are at least double the per-capita rates in high-income countries. British statistics indicate that accidental deaths were much less frequent before high-powered machinery began to spread with the Industrial Revolution of the late 1700s.

The United States collects detailed statistical injury data (sampled from 100 hospitals) through the National Electronic Injury Surveillance System administered by the Consumer Product Safety Commission. This program was revised in 2000 to include all injuries, rather than just injuries involving products. Data on emergency department visits is also collected through the annual National Health Interview Survey by the CDC's National Center for Health Statistics. The US Bureau of Labor Statistics website includes extensive data on workplace accidents.

== Analytical models ==
Many theoretical models to characterize and analyze accidents have been proposed, which can be classified by type. Most accidents have no single cause, and no single model is the sole correct approach for analyzing them. Notable models include:

Sequential models, often depicted as accident triangles, were proposed for relating the proportions of minor and major incidents. These included Heinrich's triangle (1931) and Frank E. Bird's accident ratio triangle (proposed in 1966 and shown above).

- Sequential models
  - Domino theory
  - Loss causation model
- Complex linear models
  - Energy damage model
  - Time sequence models
    - Generalized time sequence model
    - Accident evolution and barrier function
  - Epidemiological models
    - Public health analysis
    - "Resident pathogens" metaphor
- Process models
  - Multilinear events sequencing
- Systemic models
  - Skill/Rule/Knowledge model of human error
  - Reason's model of system safety (embedding the Swiss cheese model)
    - Healthcare error proliferation model
    - Human reliability
  - Human/Machine cognitive systems
- Non-linear models
  - System accident
  - Systems-theoretic accident model and process (STAMP)
  - Functional resonance analysis method (FRAM)
  - Assertions that all existing models are insufficient for complex systems

Ishikawa diagrams are sometimes used to illustrate root-cause analysis and five whys discussions.

== See also ==
- Accident insurance
- Accident-proneness
- Act of God
- Fail-safe
- Idiot-proof
- Injury prevention
- Lists of disasters
- Personal protective equipment
- Poka-yoke
- Risk management
- Safety
- Safety engineering
