= Healthcare error proliferation model =

Model of how errors happen in healthcare

The healthcare error proliferation model is an adaptation of James Reason’s Swiss Cheese Model designed to illustrate the complexity inherent in the contemporary healthcare delivery system and the attribution of human error within these systems. The healthcare error proliferation model explains the etiology of error and the sequence of events typically leading to adverse outcomes. This model emphasizes the role organizational and external cultures contribute to error identification, prevention, mitigation, and defense construction.

== Introduction ==
Healthcare systems are complex in that they are diverse in both structure (e.g. nursing units, pharmacies, emergency departments, operating rooms) and professional mix (e.g. nurses, physicians, pharmacists, administrators, therapists) and made up of multiple interconnected elements with adaptive tendencies in that they have the capacity to change and learn from experience. The term complex adaptive systems (CAS) was coined at the interdisciplinary Santa Fe Institute (SFI), by John H. Holland, and Murray Gell-Mann. Subsequently, scholars such as Ruth A. Anderson, Rubin McDaniels, and Paul Cilliers have extended CAS theory and research to the social sciences such as education and healthcare.

== Model overview ==
The healthcare error proliferation model (HEPM) adapts the Swiss Cheese Model to the complexity of healthcare delivery systems and integrated organizations. The Swiss Cheese Model, likens the complex adaptive system to multiple hole infested slices of Swiss cheese positioned side-by-side. The cheese slices are dubbed defensive layers to describe their role and function as the system location outfitted with features capable of intercepting and deflecting hazards. The layers represent discrete locations or organizational levels potentially populated with errors permitting error progression. The four layers include: 1) organizational leadership, 2) risky supervision, 3) situations for unsafe practices, and 4) unsafe performance.

The HEPM portrays hospitals as having multiple operational defensive layers outfitted with essential elements necessary to maintain key defensive barricades (Cook & O'Connor, 2005; Reason, 2000). By examining the defensive layers attributes, prospective locales of failure, the etiology of accidents might be revealed (Leape et al., 1995). Experts have discussed the importance of examining these layers within the context of the complex adaptive healthcare system (Kohn et al., 2000; Wiegmann & Shappell, 2003) and considering the psychological safety of clinicians. Hence, this model expands Reason’s seminal work.

The model incorporates the complex adaptive healthcare system as a key characteristic. Complex adaptive systems characteristically demonstrate self-organization as diverse agents interact spontaneously in nonlinear relationships where professionals act as information processors (Cilliers, 1998; McDaniel & Driebe, 2001) and co-evolve with the environment (Casti, 1997). Healthcare professionals function in the system as diverse actors within the complex environment utilizing different methods to process information (Coleman, 1999) and solve systemic problems within and across organizational layers (McDaniel & Driebe, 2001).

=== Definitions ===
A complex adaptive healthcare system (CAHS) is a care delivery enterprise with diverse clinical and administrative agents acting spontaneously, interacting in nonlinear networks where agents and patients are information processors, and actively co-evolve with their environment with the purposed to produce safe and reliable patient-centered outcomes.

== See also ==
- Adverse effect (medicine)
- Adverse event
- Evidence-based medicine
- Hospital accreditation
- Iatrogenesis
- Iatrogenic disorder
- International healthcare accreditation
- Latent human error
- Medical error
- Nursing care
- Patient safety organization
- Peter Pronovost
- Root cause analysis
- Serious adverse event
- Swiss Cheese model of accident causation in human systems

== Other literature ==
=== Complexity theory ===
- Holland, J. H. (1992). Adaptation in natural and artificial systems. Cambridge, MA: MIT Press. (ISBN 978-0262581110)
- Holland, J. H. (1995). Hidden order: How adaptation builds complexity. Reading, MA: Helix Books. (ISBN 978-0201442304)
- Holland, J. H. (1998). Emergence: From chaos to order. Reading, MA: Addison-Wesley. (ISBN 978-0738201429)
- Waldrop, M. M. (1990). Complexity: The emerging science at the edge of order and chaos. New York: Simon & Schuster (ISBN 978-0671767891)
