= Ruben Jaari =

Finnish businessman (1906–1991)

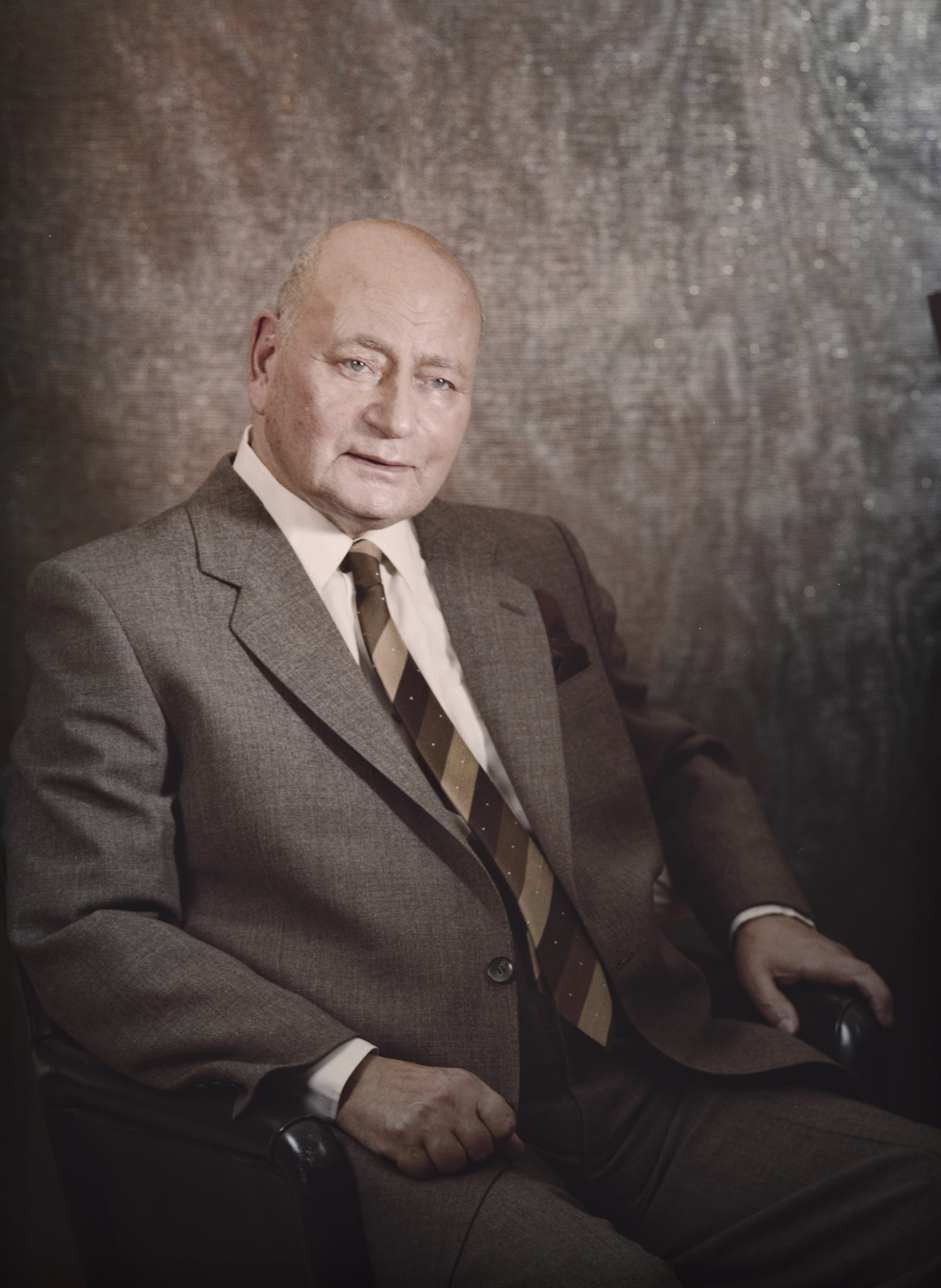
- Portrait photograph taken in 1985
- Born: Robert Jankeloff; 22 January 1906; Helsinki, Grand Duchy of Finland, Russian Empire (now Finland)
- Died: 15 August 1991 (aged 85); Helsinki, Finland
- Occupation: Businessman

Ruben Jaari (until 1936 Robert Jankeloff; 22 January 1906 Helsinki – 15 August 1991 Helsinki) was a Finnish businessman and founder of the department store Pukeva.

== Biography ==
Jaari's parents were Samuel and Lena Jankeloff, and the family – originally from Russia – moved to Helsinki in the 1860s. The Jankeloff family maintained clothing shops in Kamppi and in Annankatu, in central Helsinki. As well as Ruben the Jankeloff family had three other sons: Sender, David, and Fabian (known as Fajo). Sender later emigrated to the United States. During the First World War the family moved to Copenhagen, but they returned in the 1920s to Finland.

Ruben Jaari trained as an electrical engineer in France and Germany, changing his surname to Jaari in the 1930s. He founded a store, named Kappa, in 1933 and sold in Vuorikatu with his brother Fajo women's jackets. Fajo was later to found his own business.

In 1939 Jaari married Irene Friedländer, a Latvian Jew whose parents later were murdered in the Holocaust. Ruben and Irene had three children: Rea (b. 1940), who moved to England, married James Reason and works as a psychologist; Ray (1943–1991), who died in a car accident; and Ralph (b. 1949), who today works in the construction trade in Tallinn.

Pukeva went bankrupt during the Recession of the 1990s, partly due to the construction of Kaisaniemi metro station.

Jaari died in 1991, and is buried in the Jewish Cemetery in Helsinki.

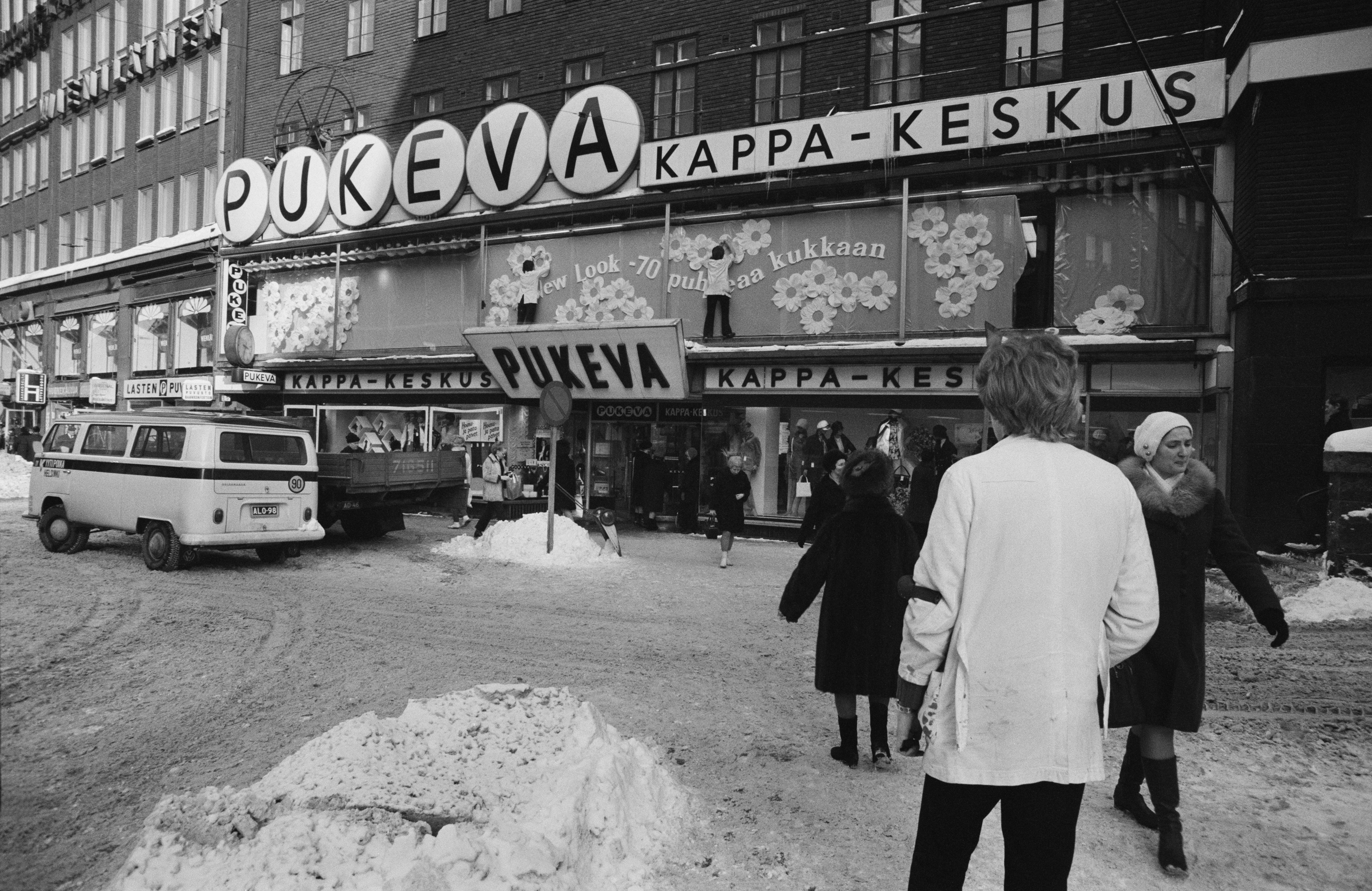
Pukeva store in 1970

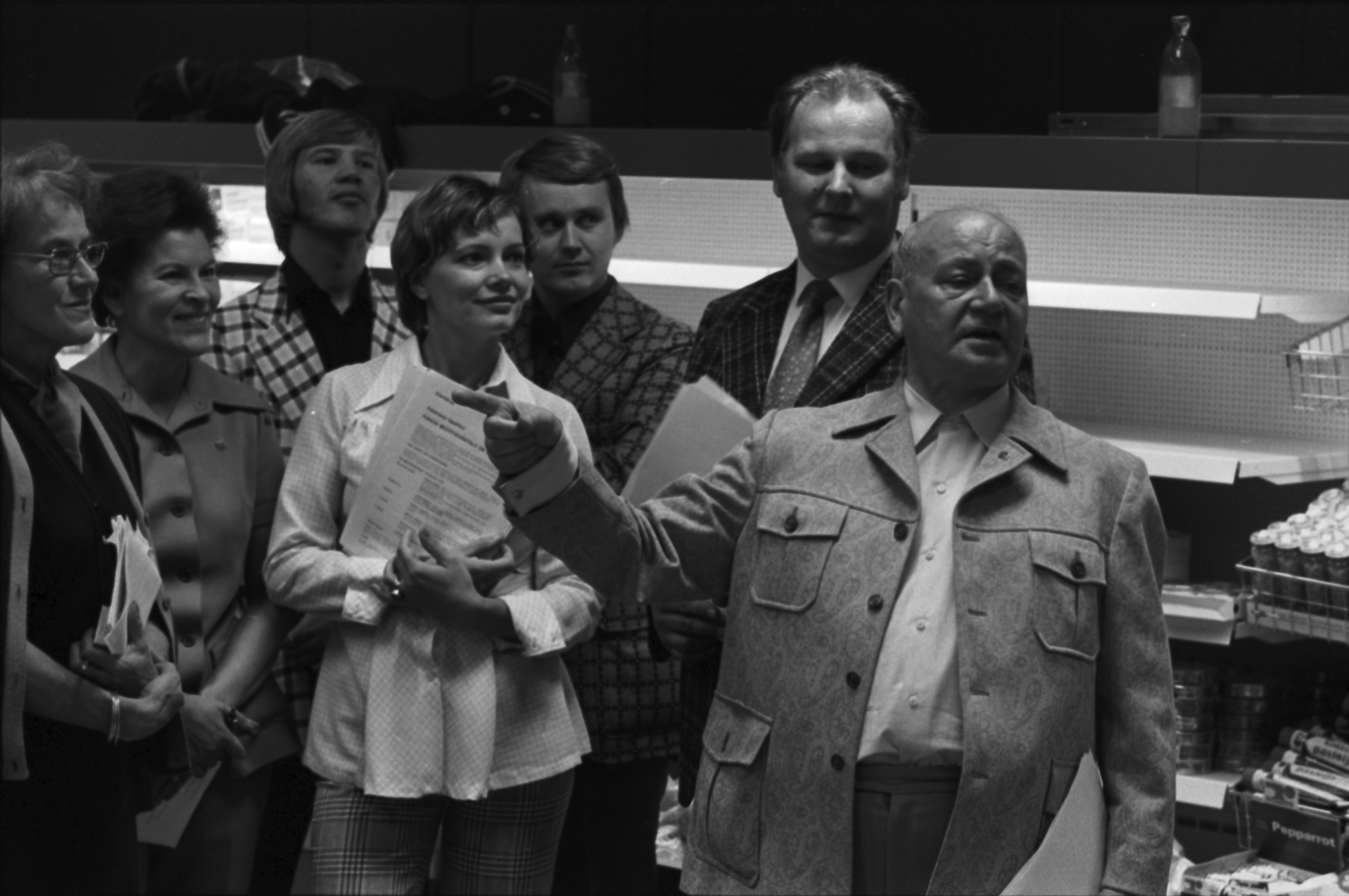
Ruben Jaari (to the right) with staff in 1973
