= Accident analysis =

Process to determine the causes of accidents to prevent recurrence

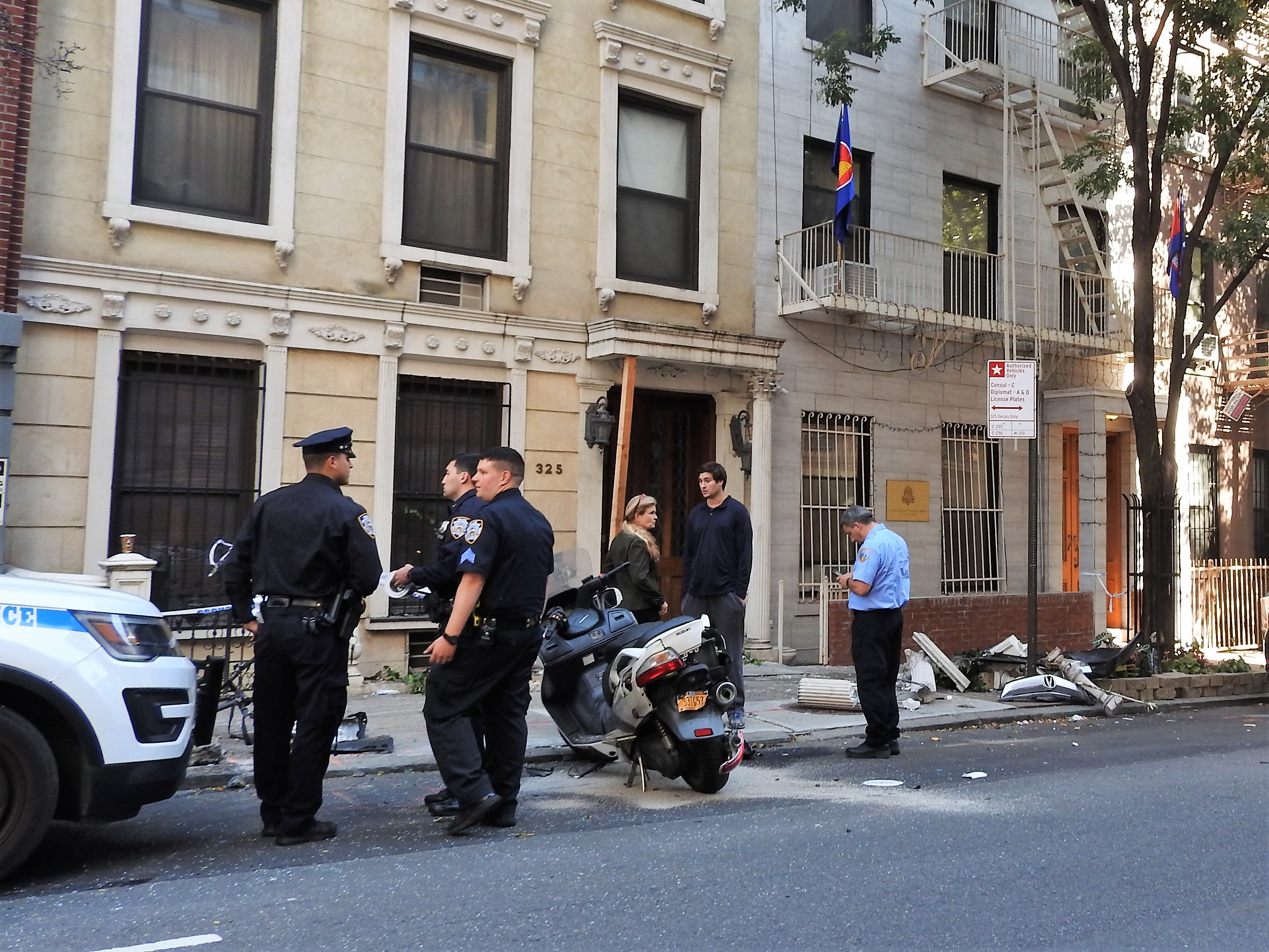
Police study the site where a car crashed

Accident analysis is a process carried out in order to determine the cause or causes of an accident (that can result in single or multiple outcomes) so as to prevent further accidents of a similar kind. It is part of accident investigation or incident investigation . These analyses may be performed by a range of experts, including forensic scientists, forensic engineers or health and safety advisers. Accident investigators, particularly those in the aircraft industry, are colloquially known as "tin-kickers". Health and safety and patient safety professionals prefer using the term "incident" in place of the term "accident". Its retrospective nature means that accident analysis is primarily an exercise of directed explanation; conducted using the theories or methods the analyst has to hand, which directs the way in which the events, aspects, or features of accident phenomena are highlighted and explained. These analyses are also invaluable in determining ways to prevent future incidents from occurring. They provide good insight by determining root causes, into what failures occurred that led to the incident.

== Sequence ==
Accident analysis is generally performed in four key steps. OSHA combines the last two steps into a singular final step of preparing and issuing a report. However, most organizations follow some form of these steps, in this order:

1. Fact gathering: After an accident, a forensic process is started to gather all possibly relevant facts that may contribute to understanding the accident. This can be physical evidence, digital evidence, and/or first-hand accounts from witnesses. In occupational settings, this could also be records of machinery, personnel present, and operating procedures.
2. Fact Analysis: After the forensic process has been completed or at least delivered some results, the facts are put together to give a "big picture." The history of the accident is reconstructed and checked for consistency and plausibility. This is also where the use of analysis methods can come into play.

Hierarchy of Controls from NIOSH

1. Conclusion Drawing: If the accident history is sufficiently informative, conclusions can be drawn. These conclusions can be firm findings that were direct causing factors or they can be a list of possible contributing factors.
2. Counter-measures: In some cases, the development of counter-measures or recommendations are made to prevent further accidents of the same kind. The analysis step can also aid in pointing out other possible risk factors that could be mitigated during this step. These counter measures can be things like the implementation of controls following the hierarchy of controls.

== Methods ==
There exist numerous forms of Accident Analysis methods. These can generally be divided into four main categories which break up how and who completes the analysis.

1. Causal Analysis (Root cause analysis) uses the principle of causality to determine the course of events. Though people casually speak of a "chain of events", results from Causal Analysis usually have the form of directed a-cyclic graphs – the nodes being events and the edges the cause-effect relations. Methods of Causal Analysis differ in their respective notion of causation.
2. Systematic Analysis relies on using a standardized system or model for developing conclusions. This tends to be a rigorous effort that is performed by an expert. This method leaves little room for doubt and can be beneficial by ensuring expert bias does not come into play.
3. Expert Analysis relies on the knowledge and experience of field experts. This form of analysis usually lacks a rigorous (formal/semiformal) methodological approach. This usually affects falsifiability and objectivity of analyses. This is of importance when conclusions are heavily disputed among experts.
4. Organizational Analysis relies on systemic theories of organization. Most theories imply that if a system's behavior stayed within the bounds of the ideal organization then no accidents can occur. Organizational Analysis can be falsified and results from analyses can be checked for objectivity. Choosing an organizational theory for accident analysis comes from the assumption that the system to be analyzed conforms to that theory.

Accident analysis breaks down the mechanisms of accidents and provides essential knowledge for the identification of hazards and justification for safety measures. To produce useful knowledge and avoid overlooking potential accident events, accident analysis should strive to identify as many hazardous events as possible. Among the methods that can contribute to greater extraction of information, we can identify the Accident Anatomy (AA) method, AcciMap, Systems-Theoretic Accident Model and Processes (STAMP), and Functional Resonance Analysis Method (FRAM). However, these methods have their limitations. The AA method and AcciMap appear to better meet the completeness requirements in the analysis. However, the AA method readily serves not only as a method for post-accident analysis (the analysis of multiple accident reports through post-accident analyses to assess as many recorded events as available) but also allows us to conduct predictive analysis. The latter analysis is carried out by identifying the deviations from operational and emergency procedures and the associated events that may lead ultimately to accidents. The joint use of post-accident and predictive analyses in the AA method is likely to result in increased knowledge delivery.

== Models ==
Many models or systems have been developed to characterise and analyse accidents.

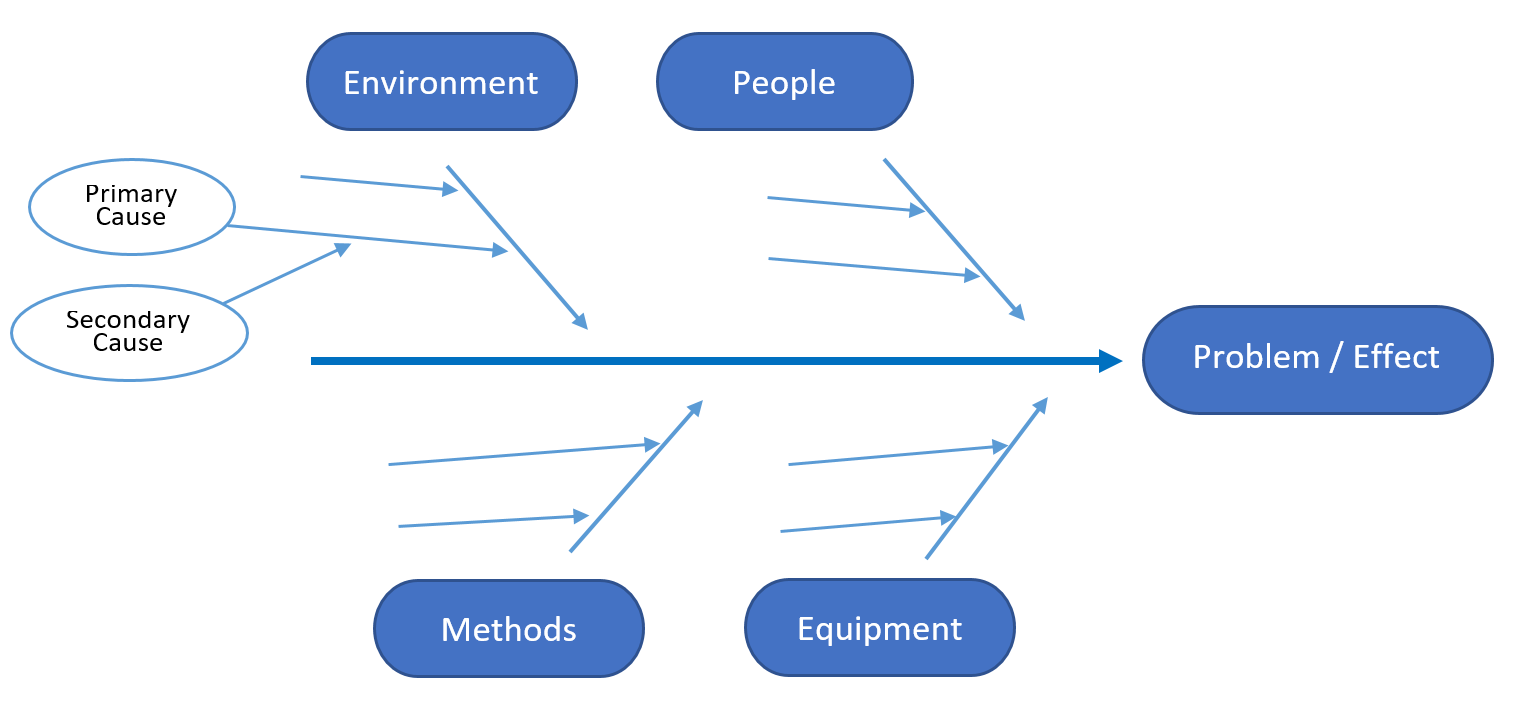
Template for an Ishikawa diagram

Some of common models are similar to Hazard Analysis models. When used for accident analysis they are worked in reverse. Instead of trying to identify possibly problems and ways to mitigate those problems, the models are used to find the cause of an incident that has already occurred. Some common types of these models include the Five Why's model, Ishikawa (fishbone) diagram, the Fault Tree Analysis (FTA), or the Failure Mode and Effect Analysis (FMEA).

1. Five Why's Model: Also known as "Why-Because" model, this model uses the idea of breaking an incident up into the fine details. Asking why something occurred, and what occurred that made that happen. It is used to determine exact causes and can extend much beyond a simple "five" whys.
2. Ishikawa Diagram: Takes into account environmental, human, methodical, and equipment causes that can lead to a problem. Using this model, an accident analyst could work backwards from the problem to find and mitigate potential causes.
3. Fault Tree Analysis: Uses a tree type "yes/no" cause and effect analysis to determine potential causes of failures. In accident analysis it could be used to determine leading factors, post-incident. This model works like a flow chart to help show all processes and systems that may have effected the outcome of the incident.
4. Failure Mode and Effect Analysis: This model uses a quantitative value to represent qualitative metrics like probability and severity. These values rank 1–5 with 1 being least probable or least severe and 5 being most probable or severe. The probability and severity values are then placed into a risk matrix to determine the overall risk. This can be beneficial in incident analysis by helping to determine other risk factors that could occur once an incident has happened.

== Using photographs to extract evidence ==
Once all available data has been collected by accident scene investigators and law enforcement officers, camera matching, photogrammetry or rectification can be used to determine the exact location of physical evidence shown in the accident scene photos.

1. Camera matching: Camera matching uses accident scene photos that show various points of evidence. The technique uses CAD software to create a 3-dimensional model of the accident site and roadway surface. All survey data and photos are then imported into a three dimensional software package like 3D Studio Max. A virtual camera can be then be positioned relative to the 3D roadway surface. Physical evidence is then mapped from the photos onto the 3D roadway to create a three dimensional accident scene drawing.
2. Photogrammetry: Photogrammetry is used to determine the three-dimensional geometry of an object on the accident scene from the original two dimensional photos. The photographs can be used to extract evidence that may be lost after the accident is cleared. Photographs from several viewpoints are imported into software like PhotoModeler. The forensic engineer can then choose points common to each photo. The software will calculate the location of each point in a three dimensional coordinate system.
3. Rectification: Photographic rectification is also used to analyze evidence that may not have been measured at the accident scene. Two dimensional rectification transforms a single photograph into a top-down view. Software like PC-Rect can be used to rectify a digital photograph.

== Modern Accident Analysis Techniques ==
Recent advancements in technology have significantly enhanced the process of trucking collision analysis, allowing investigators to understand, prevent, and resolve accidents with greater precision and efficiency. These innovations provide detailed insights into the causes of accidents, help determine liability, and contribute to improving overall road safety.

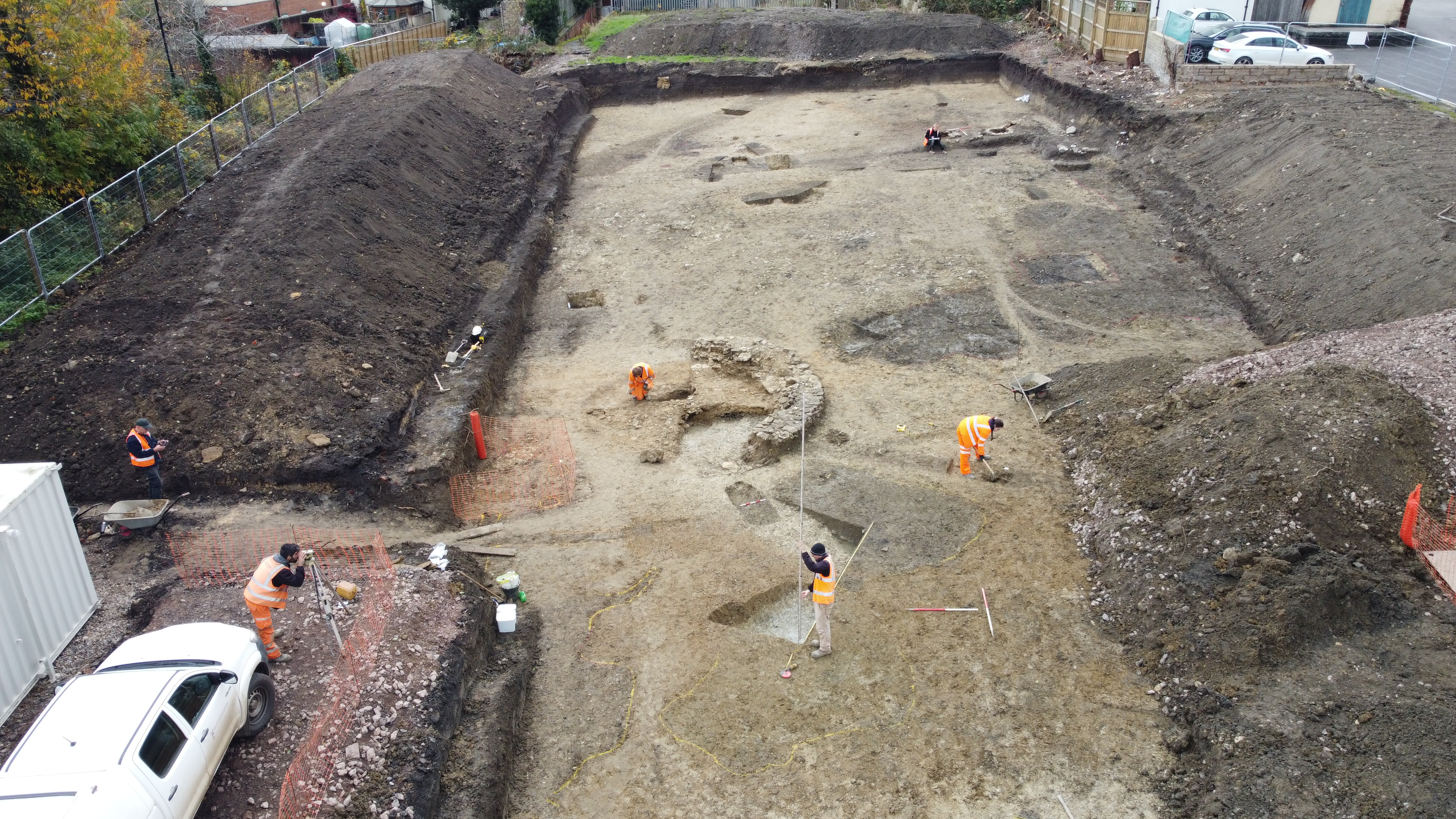
Drone surveying construction site

- Drones and aerial imaging: Drones are unmanned aerial vehicles (UAVs) equipped with high-resolution cameras and sensors to capture images, videos, and 3D maps of accident sites and workplace. Drones can quickly survey and capture the accident scene or hazardous locations without endangering investigators.
- Cameras or CCTV: provide video footage, some from multiple angles, before and during an incident. Other cameras like thermal or surveillance cameras can detect hazards or unsafe behavior before the risk becomes too great
- Artificial Intelligence (AI): improving risk assessment, and ensuring faster emergency responses. It enables data-driven safety decisions, reducing workplace hazards in industries like manufacturing, construction, and logistics.
- Augmented Reality (AR): allows investigators to study crash sites without physical constraints, improving accuracy, safety, and efficiency. It enhances training by simulating real-world accidents, reducing exposure to hazards, and enabling global collaboration in aviation safety.

With these technological advancements, accident analysis continues to evolve, providing more precise, data-driven insights that enhance safety, streamline investigations, and support legal and insurance processes.

== Human Failure ==
Human failure is categorized into two main types: errors and violations. Errors, which are unintended actions where a worker makes an incorrect decision based on lack of knowledge or training. Violations are intentional deviations from rules or procedures, often done with good intentions to complete a task efficiently. These violations typically result from poor task or equipment design, impractical procedures, or lack of understanding. Addressing violations requires understanding why they occur, improving design, making rules more practical, and involving workers in developing safety procedures.

To effectively manage human failure, companies should focus on identifying critical human errors, assessing performance-influencing factors (PIFs), and implementing preventive measures such as improved training and task design. Incident investigations should go beyond blaming "operator error" and instead analyze the underlying reasons for failure. Common pitfalls in managing human failure include assuming that workers will always detect and correct problems, relying too much on training to prevent slips and lapses, ignoring human factors in risk assessments, and underestimating the probability of human errors in safety analyses.

== OSHA Incident Reports ==
Employers must report a fatality within 8 hours and report hospitalizations, amputations, and eye loss within 24 hours of the incident. These reporting requirements apply to most private sector employers in the U.S., except for farms and government entities. State OSHA plans may have slightly different requirements, so employers should verify their state-specific regulations.

There are three ways to report an incident to OSHA:

1. Calling the local OSHA office
2. using the 24-hour OSHA hotline (1-800-321-6742)
3. Reporting online.

When reporting, employers must provide key details such as the business name, employee(s) affected, date and time of the incident, location, a brief description, and a contact person's information. Certain work-related vehicle accidents must be reported, particularly if they occur in a construction work zone, but incidents on public streets or while using public transportation are generally exempt.

Some cases require clarification:

- An amputation must always be reported.
- If an employee suffers a heart attack at work that results in hospitalization or death, it should be reported so OSHA can determine if an investigation is necessary.
- If a fatality occurs within 30 days, the event must still be reported
- Temporary worker injuries must be reported by the employer providing day-to-day supervision.

Reporting an incident does not automatically trigger an OSHA investigation, but employers should always be prepared. Following OSHA Standard 1904.39, maintaining accurate injury and illness records, and prioritizing workplace safety through regular safety meetings can help businesses stay compliant and improve overall safety. Reading the incident reports filed by the company can provide some insight into what happened.

== Related ==
- Safety engineering – Engineering discipline
- System accident – Unanticipated interaction of multiple failures in a complex system
- Trace evidence – Type of evidence of physical contact
- Human factors and ergonomics
- Human reliability – Factor in safety, ergonomics and system resilience
- Pilot error – Decision, action, or inaction by an aircraft pilot
- Accident – Unforeseen event, often with a negative outcome
- Accident classification – Ways of classifying accidents
- Chain of events (accident analysis) – Series of contributing factors leading to an undesired outcome
- Debugging – Fixing defects in an engineered system
- Forensic engineering – Investigation of failures associated with legal intervention
- Forensic science – Application of science to law and investigation
- AcciMap analysis – Systems-based technique for accident analysis
- Swiss cheese model – Model used in risk analysis

== Footnotes ==
- "Accident Investigation". U.S. Department of Labor, Occupational Safety & Health Administration. Archived from the original on 17 May 2007.
  - Occupational Safety and Health Administration, U.S. Department of Labor (February 1, 2005). "Standard 29 CFR 1960.29".
