= Accident triangle =

Theory of industrial accident prevention

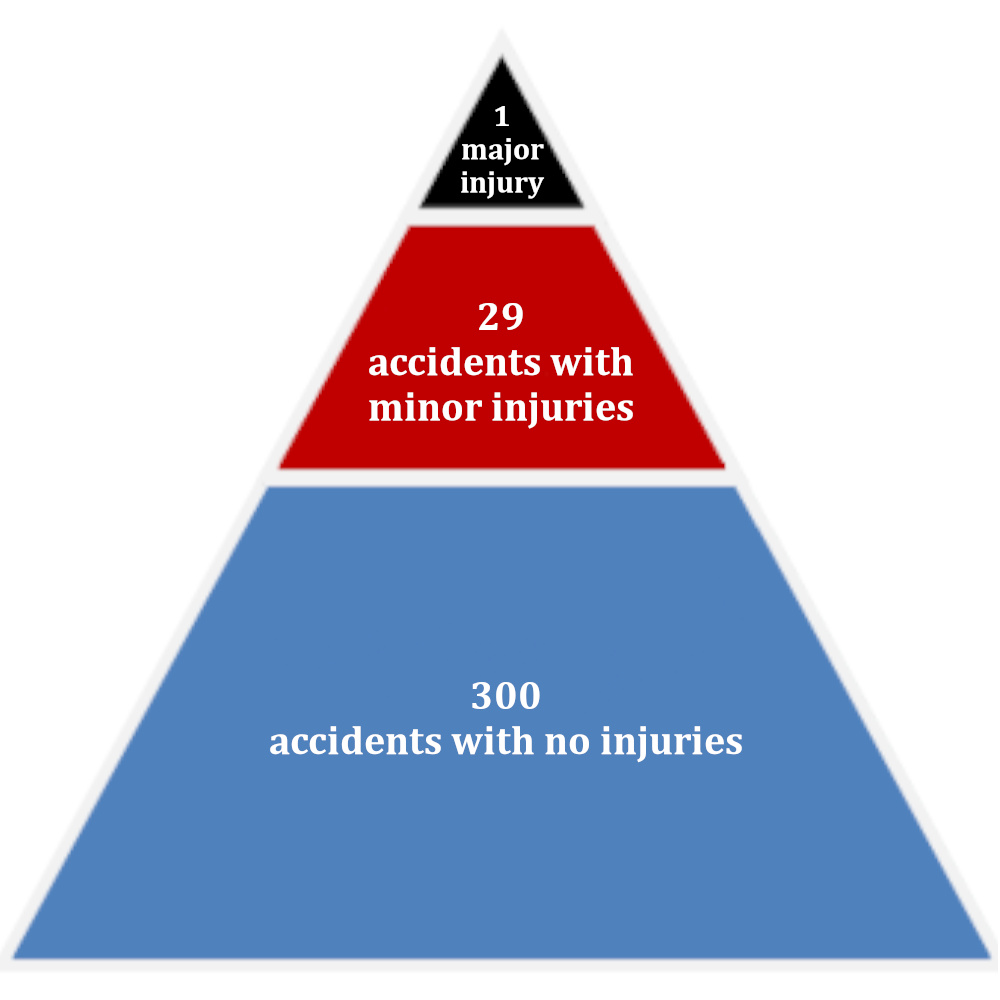
A depiction of Heinrich's original ratios

The accident triangle, also known as Heinrich's triangle or Bird's triangle, is a theory of industrial accident prevention. It shows a relationship between serious accidents, minor accidents and near misses. This idea proposes that if the number of minor accidents is reduced then there will be a corresponding fall in the number of serious accidents. The triangle was first proposed by Herbert William Heinrich in 1931 and has since been updated and expanded upon by other writers, notably Frank E. Bird. It is often shown pictorially as a triangle or pyramid and has been described as a cornerstone of 20th century workplace health and safety philosophy. In recent times it has come under criticism over the values allocated to each category of accident and for focusing only on the reduction in minor injuries.

== Development ==
The triangle shows a relationship between the number of accidents resulting in serious injury, minor injuries or no injuries. The relationship was first proposed in 1931 by Herbert William Heinrich in his Industrial Accident Prevention: A Scientific Approach. Heinrich was a pioneer in the field of workplace health and safety. He worked as an assistant superintendent for an insurance company and wanted to reduce the number of serious industrial accidents. He commenced a study of more than 75,000 accident reports from the insurance company's files as well as records held by individual industry sites. From this data he proposed a relationship of one major injury accident to 29 minor injury accidents, to 300 no-injury accidents. He drew the conclusion that, by reducing the number of minor accidents, industrial companies would see a correlating fall in the number of major accidents. The relationship is often shown pictorially in the form of a triangle or pyramid. The pyramid allows individuals to narrow down the root cause and eliminate or control the hazard or cause. The triangle was widely used in industrial health and safety programs over the following 80 years and was described as a cornerstone of health and safety philosophy. Heinrich's theory also suggested that 88% of all accidents were caused by a human decision to carry out an unsafe act.

An expanded triangle similar to that proposed by Bird in 1966

The theory was developed further by Frank E Bird in 1966 based on the analysis of 1.7 million accident reports from almost 300 companies. He produced an amended triangle that showed a relationship of one serious injury accident to 10 minor injury (first aid only) accidents, to 30 damage causing accidents, to 600 near misses. However, one could assume that not all minor injuries and near misses will be reported, which will result in some fault of the triangle. The numbers used by Bird were confirmed by a 1974 study by A. D. Swain, entitled The Human Element in Systems Safety. The theory was later expanded upon by Bird and Germain in 1985's Practical Loss Control Leadership. Bird showed a relationship between the number of reported near misses and the number of major accidents and claimed that the majority of accidents could be predicted and prevented by an appropriate intervention.

== Criticism ==
Heinrich's triangle had a significant impact on health and safety culture in the 20th century but has recently been criticized. Some of this criticism regards to the exact figures used in the relationship. A 2010 report relating to the oil and gas industry showed that the original values held true only when applied to a large dataset and a broad range of activities. A 1991 study showed that in confined spaces the relationship was significantly different: 1.2 minor injuries for each serious injury or death. A broad study of UK accident data in the mid-1990s showed a relationship of 1 fatality to 207 major injuries, to 1,402 injuries causing three or more days lost time injuries, to 2,754 minor injuries. Heinrich's original files have since been lost so his accident figures cannot be proven.

W. Edwards Deming stated that Heinrich's theory attributing human action as the cause of most accidents in the workplace was incorrect and it was, in fact, poor management systems that caused the majority of accidents. There has also been criticism of the triangle for focusing attention on the reduction of minor accidents. It has been claimed that this has led to workplace supervisors to ignore more serious but less likely risks when planning works in order to focus on reducing the likelihood of more common but less serious risks. The 2010 oil and gas study claimed that this attitude had led to a halt in the reduction of fatalities in that industry in the preceding five to eight years, despite a significant reduction in minor accidents.
