= Herbert William Heinrich =

American business writer

Herbert William Heinrich (Bennington, Vermont, October 6, 1886 – June 22, 1962) was an American industrial safety pioneer from the 1930s.

== Biography ==
He was born on October 6, 1886, in Bennington, Vermont.

He was an assistant superintendent of the Engineering and Inspection Division of Travelers Insurance Company when he published his book Industrial Accident Prevention, A Scientific Approach in 1931. One empirical finding from his 1931 book became known as Heinrich's law: that in a workplace, for every accident that causes a major injury, there are 29 accidents that cause minor injuries and 300 accidents that cause no injuries.

Heinrich died on June 22, 1962, at the age of 76.

== Heinrich's law ==
Heinrich's work is claimed as the basis for the theory of behavior-based safety by some experts of this field, which holds that as many as 95 percent of all workplace accidents are caused by unsafe acts. Heinrich came to this conclusion after reviewing thousands of accident reports completed by supervisors, who generally blamed workers for causing accidents without conducting detailed investigations into the root causes.

While Heinrich's figure that 88 percent of all workplace accidents and injuries/illnesses are caused by "man-failure" is perhaps his most oft-cited conclusion, his book actually encouraged employers to control hazards, not merely focus on worker behaviors. "No matter how strongly the statistical records emphasize personal faults or how imperatively the need for educational activity is shown, no safety procedure is complete or satisfactory that does not provide for the ... correction or elimination of ... physical hazards", Heinrich wrote in his book. Emphasizing this aspect of workplace safety, Heinrich devoted 100 pages of his work to the subject of machine guarding. His research is criticized by some, such as Bruce Main and William Edwards Deming, for being outdated and unscientific. Main thinks that Heinrich's law should be replaced by a model that emphasizes safety in design, compared to the former's emphasis on behavior.

== Legacy ==
Heinrich's classic work was refuted by a 1980 book Industrial Accident Prevention, by Nestor Roos, H Heinrich, Julienne Brown and Dan Petersen.

Heinrich Revisited: Truisms or Myths by Fred A. Manuele, CSP, PE [2002, ISBN 0-87912-245-5 published by National Safety Council offers the following in the last chapter.

The intent of this book is to present a review of the origin of certain of Heinrich's premises that became accepted as truisms, how they evolved and changed over time, and to determine their validity. A summary of the observations made in this book follows.

1. Files pertaining to Heinrich's research do not exist. Thus, there is no material to review as the quality of research, or the analytical system used to arrive at his premises or their validity.

2. Heinrich's studies were made of accidents that occurred in the 1920s. Safety at work and the workplace itself have changed substantively since then, as evidenced by noteworthy reductions in accident experience in the past 70 years. Therefore, the current value and applicability of his conclusions should be questioned and researched.

3. Although psychology has a place in safety management, the emphasis Heinrich gave to it as being "a fundamental of great importance in accident causation" was disproportionate, and that overemphasis influenced his work considerably.

4. Heinrich's 88-10-2 ratios indicate that among the direct and proximate causes, 88 percent are unsafe acts, 10 percent are unsafe mechanical or physical conditions and 2 percent are unpreventable

- The methodology used in arriving at those ratios cannot be supported.
- Current causation knowledge indicates the premise to be invalid.
- This premise conflicts with the work of others, such as W. Edwards Deming, whose research finds root causes to derive from shortcomings in the management systems.
- Among all the Heinrich premises, application of these ratios has had the greatest impact on the practice of safety, and has done the most harm, since it promotes preventive efforts being focused on the worker, rather than on the operating system.

5. The Foundation Of A Major Injury, the 300-29-1 ratios (Heinrich's triangle) is the least tenable of his premises.

- It is impossible to conceive of incident data being gathered through the usual reporting methods in 1926 in which 10 out of 11 accidents could be no-injury cases.
- Conclusions pertaining to the 300-29-1 ratios were revised from edition to edition, without explanation, thus presenting questions about which version is valid.

6. Heinrich's often-stated belief that the predominant causes of no-injury accidents are identical with the predominant causes of accidents resulting in major injuries is not supported by convincing evidence and is questioned by several authors. Application of the premise results in misdirection since those who apply it may presume, inappropriately, that if they concentrate their efforts on the types of accidents that occur frequently, the potential for severe injury will be addressed.

- Investigation of numerous accidents resulting in fatality or serious injury by modern-day safety professionals leads to the conclusion that their causal factors are not linked to accidents that occur frequently and result in minor injury

7. No documentation exists to support Heinrich's 4-1 ratio of indirect injury costs to direct costs. Further, arriving at a ratio that is universally applicable is implausible.

8. In Principles of Accident Prevention, Heinrich place an inordinate emphasis on the unsafe acts of individuals as causal factors and gives insufficient attention to causal factors deriving from operating systems. It is this author's belief that many safety practitioners would not agree with Heinrich's premise that "man failure is the heart of the problem and the methods of control must be directed toward man failure."

9. In Heinrich's Accident Factors, prominence is given to causal factors deriving from ancestry and environment and to the faults of persons that allegedly derive from inherited or acquired faults, that is, inappropriate with respect to current societal mores...

The later book, "On the Practice of Safety, Third Edition," by Fred Manuele [2003, ISBN 0-471-27275-2 published by John Wiley & Sons, Inc] further discusses Heinrich and compares and contrasts his finding with those of W. Edwards Deming.
