= James Reason =

British psychologist (1938–2025)

James Reason CBE
- Born: James Tootle; 1 May 1938; Garston, Hertfordshire, England
- Died: 4 February 2025 (aged 86); Slough, England
- Education: University of Manchester; University of Leicester
- Known for: Swiss cheese model
- Spouse: Rea Jaari (m. 1964)
- Children: 2
- Scientific career
- Fields: Psychology
- Workplaces: University of Leicester; University of Manchester

James Tootle Reason CBE (né Tootle; 1 May 1938 – 4 February 2025) was a British professor of psychology at the University of Manchester, from where he graduated in 1962 and was a tenured professor from 1977 until 2001.

Reason propounded the Swiss cheese model using the concept of layered security, used in risk analysis in many areas including aviation safety and emergency service organizations.

== Background ==
James Tootle was born in Garston, Hertfordshire, on 1 May 1938. His father was killed during The Blitz, and his mother died several years later, leaving him to be raised by his maternal grandfather, Thomas Reason, whose surname he adopted. He was educated at the University of Manchester and the University of Leicester.

== Career ==
Reason wrote books on human error, including absent-mindedness, aviation human factors, maintenance errors, and risk management for organizational accidents. In 2003, he was awarded an honorary DSc by the University of Aberdeen. He was a Fellow of the British Academy, the British Psychological Society, the Royal Aeronautical Society, and the Royal College of General Practitioners. He was appointed a Commander of the Order of the British Empire (CBE) in the 2003 New Year Honours "for services to Reducing the Risk in Healthcare." In 2011, he was elected an honorary Safety and Reliability Society fellow.

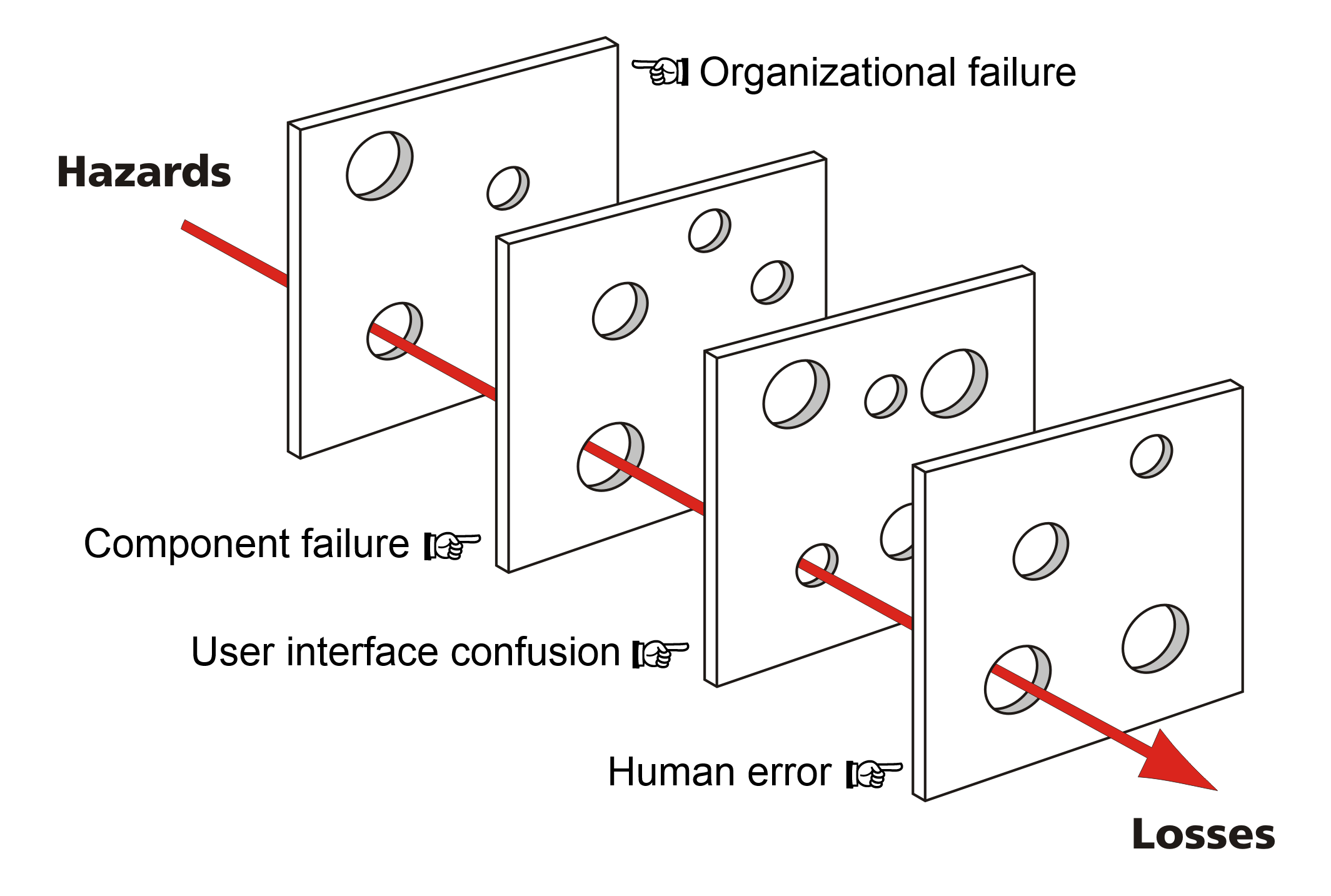
Swiss cheese model of accident causation with example barrier layers

Among his many contributions is the introduction of the Swiss cheese model, a conceptual framework for the description of accidents based on the notion that accidents will happen only if multiple barriers fail, thus creating a path from an initiating cause to the ultimate, unwanted consequences, such as harm to people, assets, the environment, etc. Reason also described the first fully developed theory of a just culture in his 1997 book, Managing the Risks of Organizational Accidents.

== Personal life and death ==
In 1964, Reason married educational psychologist Rea Jaari, daughter of Ruben Jaari. The couple had two children. He died from pneumonia at a Slough hospital, on 4 February 2025, at the age of 86.

== Bibliography ==
=== Books ===
- Human Error, Cambridge University Press. 1990. ISBN 978-0-521-31419-0
- Managing the Risks of Organizational Accidents, Ashgate,1997. ISBN 978-1-84014-105-4
- Managing Maintenance Error: A Practical Guide, CRC Press. 2003. ISBN 978-0-7546-1591-0
- The Human Contribution, Routledge. 2008. ISBN 978-0-7546-7402-3
- A Life in Error, Routledge. 2013. ISBN 978-1-4724-1841-8
- Beyond Aviation Human Factors, Routledge. 2016. ISBN 978-1-84014-948-7
- Organizational Accidents Revisited, CRC Press. 2016. ISBN 978-1-4724-4768-5
