= Chain of events (accident analysis) =

Series of contributing factors leading to an undesired outcome

In accident analysis, a chain of events (or error chain) consists of the contributing factors leading to an undesired outcome.

== Aviation ==
In aviation accidents and incidents, these contributing actions typically stem from human factor-related mistakes and pilot error, rather than mechanical failure. A study conducted by Boeing found that 55% of airline accidents between 1959 and 2005 were caused by such human related factors, while only 17% of accidents were caused by mechanical issues with the aircraft.

The Tenerife airport disaster, the worst accident in aviation history, is a prime example of an accident in which a chain of events and errors can be identified leading up to the crash. Pilot error, communications problems, fog, and airfield congestion (due to a bomb threat and explosion at another airport) all contributed to this catastrophe.

== See also ==
- Swiss cheese model
