= Latent human error =

Term used in safety work and accident prevention

Latent human error is a term used in safety work and accident prevention, especially in aviation, to describe human errors which are likely to be made due to systems or routines that are formed in such a way that humans are disposed to making these errors. Latent human errors are frequently components in causes of accidents. The error is latent and may not materialize immediately, thus, latent human error does not cause immediate or obvious damage. Discovering latent errors is therefore difficult and requires a systematic approach. Latent human error is often discussed in aviation incident investigation, and contributes to over 70% of the accidents.

By gathering data about errors made, then collating, grouping and analyzing them, it can be determined whether a disproportionate amount of similar errors are being made. If this is the case, a contributing factor may be disharmony between the respective systems/routines and human nature or propensities. The routines or systems can then be analyzed, potential problems identified, and amendments made if necessary, in order to prevent future errors, incidents or accidents from occurring.

== See also ==
- Air safety
- Distracted driving
- Error

== Citations ==
- Defense Technical Information Center (1994-12-01). DTIC ADA492127: Behind Human Error: Cognitive Systems, Computers and Hindsight.
