= Failure modes, effects, and diagnostic analysis =

Systematic analysis technique

Failure modes, effects, and diagnostic analysis (FMEDA) is a systematic analysis technique to obtain subsystem / device level failure rates, failure modes, diagnostic capability, and useful life. The FMEDA technique considers:

- All components of a design,
- The functionality of each component,
- The failure modes of each component,
- The effect of each component failure mode on the product functionality,
- The ability of any automatic diagnostics to detect the failure,
- The design strength (de-rating, safety factors),
- The impact of any latent fault tests, and
- The operational profile (environmental stress factors).

Given a component database calibrated with field failure data that is reasonably accurate, the method can predict device level failure rate per failure mode, useful life, automatic diagnostic effectiveness, and latent fault test effectiveness for a given application. The predictions have been shown to be more accurate than field warranty return analysis or even typical field failure analysis given that these methods depend on reports that typically do not have sufficient detail information in failure records.

An FMEDA can predict failure rates per defined failure modes. For Functional Safety applications the IEC 61508 failure modes (safe, dangerous, annunciation, and no effect) are used. These failure rate numbers can be converted into the alternative failure modes from the automotive functional safety standard, ISO 26262.

The FMEDA name was given by Dr. William M. Goble in 1994 to the technique that had been in development since 1988 by Dr. Goble and other engineers now at exida.

== Antecedents ==
A design failure modes and effects analysis, DFMEA, is a structured qualitative analysis of a system, subsystem, device design to identify potential failure modes and their effects on correct operation. The concept and practice of performing a DFMEA, has been around in some form since the 1960s. The practice was first formalized in the 1970s with the development of US MIL-STD-1629/1629A.

A variation of DFMEA developed for functional safety applications is called Design Deviation and Mitigation Analysis (DDMA). The DDMA variation adds information not normally included in a DFMEA such as the automatic diagnostic mitigations, latent fault tests, and useful life. DDMA deletes RPN numbers as they are replaced by FMEDA results.

== Development ==
The FMEDA technique was developed in the late 1980s by exida engineers based in part on a paper in the 1984 RAMS Symposium. The initial FMEDA added additional information to the FMEA process. The first piece of information added in an FMEDA is the quantitative failure data (failure rates and the distribution of failure modes) for all components being analyzed. The second piece of information added to an FMEDA is the probability of the system or subsystem to detect internal failures via automatic on-line diagnostics. The need to measure automatic diagnostic effectiveness was recognized in the late 1980s. Functional safety failure modes were added and first documented in the book Evaluating Control System Reliability. The actual term FMEDA was first used in 1994 and after further refinement the methods were published in the late 1990s. The method was explained to members of the IEC 61508 committee in the late 90s and included in the standard as a method of determining failure rate, failure mode and diagnostic coverage for devices. FMEDA techniques have been further refined during the 2000s primarily during IEC 61508 preparation work. The key changes have been: 1. Use of Functional Failure Modes; 2. Mechanical Component Usage; 3. Prediction of latent fault test effectiveness; and 4. Prediction of product useful life.

== Functional failure mode analysis ==
In the early 2000s functional failure mode analysis was added to the FMEDA process by John C. Grebe. In early FMEDA work, component failure modes were mapped directly to "safe" or "dangerous" categories per IEC 61508, 1st Edition. This was relatively easy since everything that was not "dangerous" was "safe." With multiple failure mode categories now existing, direct assignment became more difficult. In addition, it became clear that the category assignment might change if a product were used in different applications. With direct failure mode category assignment during the FMEDA, a new FMEDA was required for each new application or each variation in usage. Under the functional failure mode approach, the actual functional failure modes of the product are identified during a DFMEA. During the detailed FMEDA, each component failure mode is mapped to a functional failure mode. The functional failure modes are then categorized according to product failure mode in a particular application.

== Mechanical FMEDA Techniques ==
It became clear in the early 2000s that many products being used in safety critical applications had mechanical components. An FMEDA done without considering these mechanical components was incomplete, misleading, and potentially dangerous. The fundamental problem in using the FMEDA technique was the lack of a mechanical component database that included part failure rates and failure mode distributions. Using a number of published reference sources, exida began development of a mechanical component database in 2003. After a few years of research and refinement, the database has been published. This has allowed the FMEDA to be used on combination electrical / mechanical components and purely mechanical components.

== Latent Fault Test Effectiveness ==
The FMEDA can predict the effectiveness of any defined latent fault test in the same way it can predict automatic diagnostic coverage. An additional column may be added to an FMEDA spreadsheet and probability of detection for each component failure mode is estimated. The cumulative effectiveness of the proof test is calculated in the same way as automatic diagnostic coverage. FMEDA tools can also calculate latent fault effectiveness.

== Device Useful Life ==
As each component within a product is reviewed, those with a relatively short useful life span are identified. One example of this is an electrolytic capacitor. Many designs have a useful life limitation of 10 years. Since constant failure rates are only valid during the useful life period, this metric is valuable for interpreting FMEDA result limitations.

== The Future ==
FMEDA Comparison Studies

Further refinement of the component database with selective calibration to different operation profiles is needed. In addition, comparisons of FMEDA results with field failure studies, have shown that human factors, especially maintenance procedures, affect the failure rates and failure modes of products.

As more data becomes available, the component database can be refined and updated. After a few years of research and refinement, the database has been published as required by new technology and new knowledge. The success of the FMEDA technique is supplying needed data in a relatively accurate way has allowed the probabilistic, performance approach to design to work.

== See also ==
- Reliability engineering
- Design Review Based on Failure Mode
- Fault Tree Analysis
- FMECA
- FMEA
- Hazard analysis and critical control points
- High availability
- List of materials analysis methods
- List of materials-testing resources
- Process decision program chart
- Risk assessment
