= Robustness validation =

Robustness validation is a skills strategy with which the Robustness of a product to the loading conditions of a real application is proven and targeted statements about risks and reliability can be made. This strategy is particularly for use in the automotive industry however could be applied to any industry where high levels of reliability are required

== History ==
At the beginning of the 1970s a relatively high failure rates of electronic components were tolerable in automobiles, because they replaced mechanical components, which had a much higher failure rate. The underlying failure rates of bimetallic flashers were 10% per year and the lifetime of mechanical ignition contacts at 10,000 miles. With the increasing number of semiconductors in control units, and the introduction of the first safety systems (ABS) in the 70s had to be addressed. Already in 1975, the General Specification for IC's in Automotive Applications as the first SAE Recommendation was issued, the 1978 SAE standard was declared and adopted by major semiconductor manufacturers.

The establishment of the Automotive Electronic Council (AEC) 1994 by Ford, Chrysler, GM - Delco was also the Starting point for the AEC-Q100 qualification process, was based on the SAE standards.

Due to the development of automotive and the ever-increasing complexity of vehicles associated with the demands for lower error rates of this qualification process, this process to decide by nonspecific tests, to cover a wide range of possible failure mechanisms, but only on the functionality of the component is out of date. In order to make statements about the robustness AEC Q100 can be replaced robustness validation.

== Initiators and participants ==
In April 2007, the Handbook for Robustness Validation of Semiconductor Devices in Automotive Applications with international cooperation from SAE, ZVEI, AEC and JSAE (Japanese Society of Automotive Engineers) was published, in which the guidelines for the contemporary validation of semiconductor components in the automotive applications were compiled. Companies were involved in this from the entire supply chain in the field of automotive electronics. In addition to vehicle manufacturers and suppliers, a large group of semiconductor manufacturers, this concept of skill is complemented with a current database. This so-called Knowledge Matrix is a list of currently known failures includes mechanisms with causes, error methods and further information.

== Contents ==
Robustness Validation is used to assess the reliability of electronic components by comparing the specific requirements of the product with the actual "real life values". With the introduction of this methodology, a specific list of requirements (usually based on the OEM) is required. The requirements for the product can be defined in the environmental requirements (mission profiles) and the functional requirements (use cases).

=== Mission profiles ===
The mission profiles describes the loads and stresses acting on the product in actual use. These are, for example, changes in temperature, temperature profile, vibration and working of electrical and mechanical fields, or other environmental factors. It is important to specify the relevant stressors in their nature, intensity and duration of exposure, as well as the mix as closely as possible. With these details it is possible, within specified accuracy, projections regarding reliability of application and its components in field applications.

=== Use cases ===
The use cases describe the nature and frequency of the operating conditions for which the product is designed. One should make sure that this addition to the normal operation of the possible cases of special operation and emergency operation. Intentional abuse is not included.

=== Robustness margin ===
The lifetimes can be hedged by specific, tailored to the application and the failure mechanisms, determined tests. An essential process are End of life tests. From the distance of the requirements to the test results, the reliability and robustness of the device can be determined.

== Product development ==
Today's standard qualification procedures for electronic components, assemblies and components for the automotive industry is based on the use of standardized tests at the end of the product development of parts and components. In contrast, Robustness Validation is a process that includes the entire product development process, as well as mass production. The qualification of the components based on the robustness analysis is thus implicit. With the introduction of robustness validation, priorities are focused on the development process again. The aim is to reduce the construction error's during the later phases of the project, which means front loading measures in the product development time line process.

It is necessary that the requirements from the product to the next level of the value chain be broken down in order to meet specific statements about possible vulnerabilities. Back in the early phases of the project is the knowledge (e.g., from knowledge bases Lessons Learned) gained from previous projects in order to avoid known vulnerabilities. Using the analysis of the changes of the new product and the use of different methods, such as REM, RBFM or design reviews, new potential vulnerabilities are identified early in order to make potential risks

== Other applications of robustness validation ==
In addition to the publication of the Handbook for Robustness Validation for semiconductor devices in 2007 the ZVEI in 2008, published the manual in which this procedure is described for the development and qualification of electronic control units in automobiles. There are also other activities in the field of sensors and electronic systems in the vehicle.
