= Pradeep Lall =

Pradeep Lall is an electrical engineer at Auburn University in Auburn, Alabama. He was named a Fellow of the Institute of Electrical and Electronics Engineers (IEEE) in 2012 for his contributions to reliability prediction for electronic packaging.
