= Failure mode, effects, and criticality analysis =

Systematic technique for failure analysis

Failure mode, effects, and criticality analysis (FMECA) is a method used to identify potential failures in a system and determine how severe their consequences would be. It is an extension of Failure mode and effects analysis (FMEA). While FMEA identifies how a product might fail, FMECA adds a criticality analysis to rank those failures based on their probability and severity.

The process acts as a structured safety check during the design phase. Engineers systematically review every component to ask: "What if this part fails?" (Failure Mode), "What happens to the system?" (Failure Effect), and "Is this risk acceptable?" (Criticality). For example, in an aircraft design, a failure in a navigation light might be ranked as low criticality (minor inconvenience), while a failure in the landing gear would be ranked as high criticality (catastrophic). This prioritization helps engineering teams focus their limited resources on fixing the most dangerous problems first.

Originally developed by the United States Armed Forces in the 1940s to improve the reliability of munitions, FMECA became a standard procedure for NASA during the Apollo program to prevent accidents in spaceflight. Today, it is widely used in high-risk industries including civil aviation, automotive manufacturing, and healthcare.

== History ==
FMECA was originally developed in the 1940s by the U.S military, which published MIL–P–1629 in 1949. By the early 1960s, contractors for the U.S. National Aeronautics and Space Administration (NASA) were using variations of FMECA under a variety of names. In 1966 NASA released its FMECA procedure for use on the Apollo program. FMECA was subsequently used on other NASA programs including Viking, Voyager, Magellan, and Galileo. Possibly because MIL–P–1629 was replaced by MIL–STD–1629 (SHIPS) in 1974, development of FMECA is sometimes incorrectly attributed to NASA. At the same time as the space program developments, use of FMEA and FMECA was already spreading to civil aviation. In 1967 the Society for Automotive Engineers released the first civil publication to address FMECA. The civil aviation industry now tends to use a combination of FMEA and Fault Tree Analysis in accordance with SAE ARP4761 instead of FMECA, though some helicopter manufacturers continue to use FMECA for civil rotorcraft.

Ford Motor Company began using FMEA in the 1970s after problems experienced with its Pinto model, and by the 1980s FMEA was gaining broad use in the automotive industry. In Europe, the International Electrotechnical Commission published IEC 812 (now IEC 60812) in 1985, addressing both FMEA and FMECA for general use. The British Standards Institute published BS 5760–5 in 1991 for the same purpose.

In 1980, MIL–STD–1629A replaced both MIL–STD–1629 and the 1977 aeronautical FMECA standard MIL–STD–2070. MIL–STD–1629A was canceled without replacement in 1998, but nonetheless remains in wide use for military and space applications today.

== Methodology ==
Slight differences are found between the various FMECA standards. By RAC CRTA–FMECA, the FMECA analysis procedure typically consists of the following logical steps:

- Define the system
- Define ground rules and assumptions in order to help drive the design
- Construct system block diagrams
- Identify failure modes (piece-part level or functional)
- Analyze failure effects/causes
- Feed results back into design process
- Classify the failure effects by severity
- Perform criticality calculations
- Rank failure mode criticality
- Determine critical items
- Feed results back into design process
- Identify the means of failure detection, isolation and compensation
- Perform maintainability analysis
- Document the analysis, summarize uncorrectable design areas, identify special controls necessary to reduce failure risk
- Make recommendations
- Follow up on corrective action implementation/effectiveness

FMECA may be performed at the functional or piece-part level. Functional FMECA considers the effects of failure at the functional block level, such as a power supply or an amplifier. Piece-part FMECA considers the effects of individual component failures, such as resistors, transistors, microcircuits, or valves. A piece-part FMECA requires far more effort, but provides the benefit of better estimates of probabilities of occurrence. However, Functional FMEAs can be performed much earlier, may help to better structure the complete risk assessment and provide other type of insight in mitigation options. The analyses are complementary.

The criticality analysis may be quantitative or qualitative, depending on the availability of supporting part failure data.

=== System definition ===
In this step, the major system to be analyzed is defined and partitioned into an indented hierarchy such as systems, subsystems or equipment, units or subassemblies, and piece-parts. Functional descriptions are created for the systems and allocated to the subsystems, covering all operational modes and mission phases.

=== Ground rules and assumptions ===
Before detailed analysis takes place, ground rules and assumptions are usually defined and agreed to. This might include, for example:

- Standardized mission profile with specific fixed duration mission phases
- Sources for failure rate and failure mode data
- Fault detection coverage that system built-in test will realize
- Whether the analysis will be functional or piece-part
- Criteria to be considered (mission abort, safety, maintenance, etc.)
- System for uniquely identifying parts or functions
- Severity category definitions

=== Block diagrams ===
Next, the systems and subsystems are depicted in functional block diagrams. Reliability block diagrams or fault trees are usually constructed at the same time. These diagrams are used to trace information flow at different levels of system hierarchy, identify critical paths and interfaces, and identify the higher level effects of lower level failures.

=== Failure mode identification ===
For each piece-part or each function covered by the analysis, a complete list of failure modes is developed. For functional FMECA, typical failure modes include:

- Untimely operation
- Failure to operate when required
- Loss of output
- Intermittent output
- Erroneous output (given the current condition)
- Invalid output (for any condition)

For piece-part FMECA, failure mode data may be obtained from databases such as RAC FMD–91 or RAC FMD–97. These databases provide not only the failure modes, but also the failure mode ratios. For example:

Device Failure Modes and Failure Mode Ratios (FMD–91)
| Device Type | Failure Mode | Ratio (α) |
|---|---|---|
| Relay | Fails to trip | .55 |
| | Spurious trip | .26 |
| | Short | .19 |
| Resistor, Composition | Parameter change | .66 |
| | Open | .31 |
| | Short | .03 |

Each function or piece-part is then listed in matrix form with one row for each failure mode. Because FMECA usually involves very large data sets, a unique identifier must be assigned to each item (function or piece-part), and to each failure mode of each item.

=== Failure effects analysis ===
Failure effects are determined and entered for each row of the FMECA matrix, considering the criteria identified in the ground rules. Effects are separately described for the local, next higher, and end (system) levels. System level effects may include:

- System failure
- Degraded operation
- System status failure
- No immediate effect

The failure effect categories used at various hierarchical levels are tailored by the analyst using engineering judgment.

=== Severity classification ===
Severity classification is assigned for each failure mode of each unique item and entered on the FMECA matrix, based upon system level consequences. A small set of classifications, usually having 3 to 10 severity levels, is used. For example, When prepared using MIL–STD–1629A, failure or mishap severity classification normally follows MIL–STD–882.

Mishap Severity Categories (MIL–STD–882)
| Category | Description | Criteria |
|---|---|---|
| I | Catastrophic | Could result in death, permanent total disability, loss exceeding $1M, or irreversible severe environmental damage that violates law or regulation. |
| II | Critical | Could result in permanent partial disability, injuries or occupational illness that may result in hospitalization of at least three personnel, loss exceeding $200K but less than $1M, or reversible environmental damage causing a violation of law or regulation. |
| III | Marginal | Could result in injury or occupational illness resulting in one or more lost work day(s), loss exceeding $10K but less than $200K, or mitigable environmental damage without violation of law or regulation where restoration activities can be accomplished. |
| IV | Negligible | Could result in injury or illness not resulting in a lost work day, loss exceeding $2K but less than $10K, or minimal environmental damage not violating law or regulation. |

Current FMECA severity categories for U.S. Federal Aviation Administration (FAA), NASA and European Space Agency space applications are derived from MIL–STD–882.

=== Failure detection methods ===
For each component and failure mode, the ability of the system to detect and report the failure in question is analyzed. One of the following will be entered on each row of the FMECA matrix:

- Normal: the system correctly indicates a safe condition to the crew
- Abnormal: the system correctly indicates a malfunction requiring crew action
- Incorrect: the system erroneously indicates a safe condition in the event of malfunction, or alerts the crew to a malfunction that does not exist (false alarm)

=== Criticality ranking ===
Failure mode criticality assessment may be qualitative or quantitative. For qualitative assessment, a mishap probability code or number is assigned and entered on the matrix. For example, MIL–STD–882 uses five probability levels:

Failure Probability Levels (MIL–STD–882)
| Description | Level | Individual Item | Fleet |
|---|---|---|---|
| Frequent | A | Likely to occur often in the life of the item | Continuously experienced |
| Probable | B | Will occur several times in the life of an item | Will occur frequently |
| Occasional | C | Likely to occur some time in the life of an item | Will occur several times |
| Remote | D | Unlikely but possible to occur in the life of an item | Unlikely, but can reasonably be expected to occur |
| Improbable | E | So unlikely, it can be assumed occurrence may not be experienced | Unlikely to occur, but possible |

The failure mode may then be charted on a criticality matrix using severity code as one axis and probability level code as the other. For quantitative assessment, modal criticality number $C_m$ is calculated for each failure mode of each item, and item criticality number $C_r$ is calculated for each item. The criticality numbers are computed using the following values:

- Basic failure rate $\lambda_p$
- Failure mode ratio $\alpha$
- Conditional probability $\beta$
- Mission phase duration $t$

The criticality numbers are computed as $C_m = \lambda_p \alpha \beta t$ and $C_r = \sum_{n=1}^N (C_m)_n$. The basic failure rate $\lambda_p$ is usually fed into the FMECA from a failure rate prediction based on MIL–HDBK–217, PRISM, RIAC 217Plus, or a similar model. The failure mode ratio may be taken from a database source such as RAC FMD–97. For functional level FMECA, engineering judgment may be required to assign failure mode ratio. The conditional probability number $\beta$ represents the conditional probability that the failure effect will result in the identified severity classification, given that the failure mode occurs. It represents the analyst's best judgment as to the likelihood that the loss will occur. For graphical analysis, a criticality matrix may be charted using either $C_m$ or $C_r$ on one axis and severity code on the other.

=== Critical item/failure mode list ===
Once the criticality assessment is completed for each failure mode of each item, the FMECA matrix may be sorted by severity and qualitative probability level or quantitative criticality number. This enables the analysis to identify critical items and critical failure modes for which design mitigation is desired.

=== Recommendations ===
After performing FMECA, recommendations are made to design to reduce the consequences of critical failures. This may include selecting components with higher reliability, reducing the stress level at which a critical item operates, or adding redundancy or monitoring to the system.

=== Maintainability analysis ===
FMECA usually feeds into both Maintainability Analysis and Logistics Support Analysis, which both require data from the FMECA. FMECA is the most popular tool for failure and criticality analysis of systems for performance enhancement. In the present era of Industry 4.0, the industries are implementing a predictive maintenance strategy for their mechanical systems. The FMECA is widely used for the failure mode identification and prioritization of mechanical systems and their subsystems for predictive maintenance.

=== FMECA report ===
A FMECA report consists of system description, ground rules and assumptions, conclusions and recommendations, corrective actions to be tracked, and the attached FMECA matrix which may be in spreadsheet, worksheet, or database form.

== Risk priority calculation ==
RAC CRTA–FMECA and MIL–HDBK–338 both identify Risk Priority Number (RPN) calculation as an alternate method to criticality analysis. The RPN is a result of a multiplication of detectability (D) x severity (S) x occurrence (O). With each on a scale from 1 to 10, the highest RPN is 10x10x10 = 1000. This means that this failure is not detectable by inspection, very severe and the occurrence is almost sure. If the occurrence is very sparse, this would be 1 and the RPN would decrease to 100. So, criticality analysis enables to focus on the highest risks.

== Advantages and disadvantages ==
The Strengths of FMECA include its comprehensiveness, the systematic establishment of relationships between failure causes and effects, and its ability to point out individual failure modes for corrective action in design.

Weaknesses include the extensive labor required, the large number of trivial cases considered, and inability to deal with multiple-failure scenarios or unplanned cross-system effects such as sneak circuits.

According to an FAA research report for commercial space transportation,

Failure Modes, effects, and Criticality Analysis is an excellent hazard analysis and risk assessment tool, but it suffers from other limitations. This alternative does not consider combined failures or typically include software and human interaction considerations. It also usually provides an optimistic estimate of reliability. Therefore, FMECA should be used in conjunction with other analytical tools when developing reliability estimates.

== See also ==
- Failure mode and effects analysis
- Integrated logistics support
- Reliability engineering
- RAMS
- Risk assessment
- Safety engineering
- System safety
