= Taiwan Railway DL2500 =

Taiwan Railways DL2500 diesel shunter
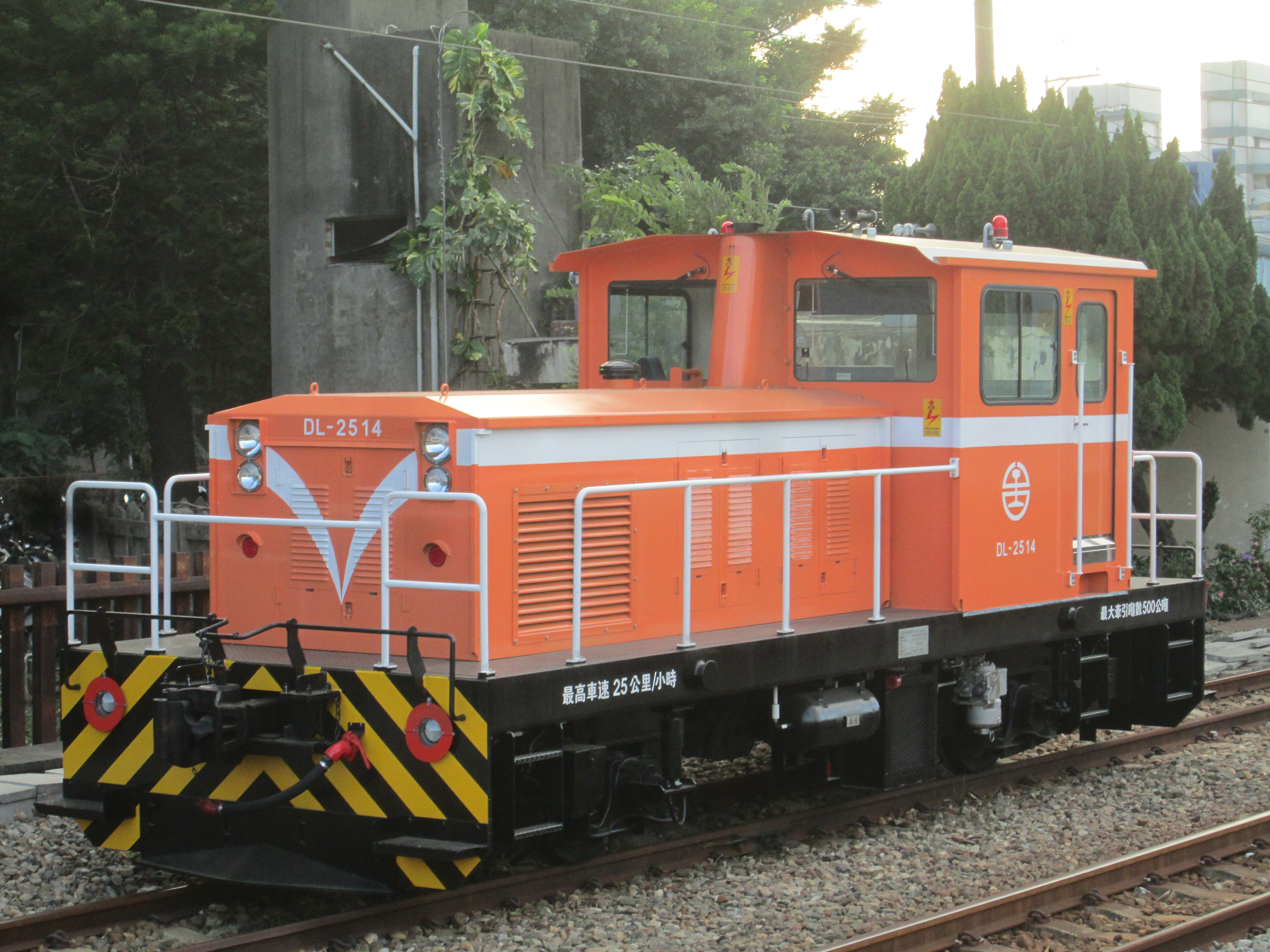
- TRA DL-2514 at Chenggong Station in 2017
Type and origin
- Power type: Diesel
- Builder: Shin Sung System Co Ltd
- Serial number: S0179－S0184 from March 2016, S0192－S0197 from August 2016, S0199－S0204 from April 2017, S0221－S0226 from March 2018
- Build date: 4 batches, delivered from 2016 to 2018
- Total produced: 24
Specifications
- Configuration
  - UIC: B
- Gauge: 1,067 mm (3 ft 6 in)
- Length: 9,060 mm (29 ft 9 in)
- Width: 2,700 mm (8 ft 10 in)
- Height: 3,340 mm (10 ft 11 in)
- Loco weight: 25 t (25 long tons; 28 short tons)
- Fuel type: Diesel
- Prime mover: Cummins QSC8.3 turbo diesel engine
- Engine type: four-stroke in-line 6-cylinder engine
Performance figures
- Maximum speed: 25 km/h (16 mph)
- Power output: 275 hp (205 kW)
Career
- Operators: Taiwan Railways
- Numbers: DL2501－DL2524
- Official name: Taiwan Railway DL2500 25-ton
- First run: March 2016

The DL2500 is a 25-ton diesel shunting locomotive used by the Taiwan Railways Administration, purchased in four batches between 2016 and 2018, for a total of 24 units

== Overview ==
Taiwan Railways has both 10- and 20-ton switchers units that have been in use for more than 30 years, the railway decided to purchase 24 new replacement shunters due to the insufficient performance of the existing units, the age of the current locomotives and the difficulty in accessing needed maintenance parts for them. A contract was awarded to the Yusheng Machinery agency for NT$290 million on January 22, 2015, which contracted South Korea's Shin Sung System Co., Ltd. to build the locomotives. However, in the past, Korean-made locomotives had a poor reputation with railway staff, especially due to the frequent failures of the PP Ziqiang train and due to difficult maintenance issues; railway maintenance staff were worried that this contract was once again awarded to a Korean company.

To reduce doubts among maintenance staff, Taiwan Railways purchased 24 DL2500 models in four batches, with railway personnel sent to the manufacturing plant to supervise and test the units, and perform any necessary changes before handing them over to the railway, in order avoid a repeat of the mistakes from the past. Taiwan Railways also implemented an independent verification and certification mechanism, with Taiwan Rhein Technical Guardian Consulting Co., Ltd awarded a contract to provide technical assistance and technical services for the locomotives, by means of RAMS analysis during their warranty period.

The Taiwan Railway Bureau also cooperated with the Ministry of Communications to help them revise policies and procedures around the use of the locomotives. The Ministry also suggested safety improvements and the railway implemented a supervision program for locomotive engineers.

== Technical specifications and manufacturing ==
The DL2500 uses the American Cummins QSC8.3 turbo diesel engine, which is a four-stroke in-line 6-cylinder engine with 275 horsepower. The locomotives are equipped with an engine control module, and their hydraulic transmission adopts the TDCN-22-1056 of the Japanese Hitachi NICO transmission system. Equipped with twin drive shafts powering the two axles of the DL2500, operating speed has been increased to 25km/h with a towing capacity of 500 metric tons, a vast improvement in performance over the 15 km/h speed and the 150 and 320 metric tons pulling capacity of the units they replaced on the railway. In terms of the working environment in the locomotives, each cab is equipped with air conditioning, fans and lighting; in terms of safety, each is equipped with a wake-up device, a speed recorder and several new types of functional and safety equipment for the crew. The introduction of the DL2500 improved the railway employees impressions of small shunting locomotives, compared with what they had known in the past.
