= John D. Musa =

American software engineer (1933–2009)

John Davis Musa (1933 – April 25, 2009) was an American software engineer and a founding father of software reliability engineering.

== Education and career ==
Musa was born on Long Island, New York. He studied at Dartmouth College, where he graduated summa cum laude in 1954 with a B.S. in engineering sciences and followed with an M.S. in electrical engineering at the same institution. Musa joined the US Navy after graduation as a member of the Reserve Officers' Training Corps. In 1958, he joined the AT&T Bell Labs, where he first worked on the Nike Zeus anti-missile system. He started working on software reliability since 1973, which began with the revolutionary paper published in 1975 in IEEE Transactions on Software Engineering, titled A Theory of Software Reliability and its Application. Musa constructed in the work a first empirical model of software reliability using mean time between failures data collected from software used at Bell Labs in the early 1970s. In 1987, Musa published the foundational book on the topic, named Software Reliability: Measurements, Prediction, Application, along with Bell Labs colleagues Anthony Iannino and Kazuhira Okumoto.

Musa was elected a Fellow of the IEEE in 1986. In 2004, Musa was named the Engineer of the Year by the IEEE Reliability Society.

== Books ==
- Musa, John D.; Iannino, Anthony; Okumoto, Kazuhira (1987). Software reliability: measurement, prediction, application. McGraw-Hill series in software engineering and technology. New York, NY: McGraw-Hill. ISBN 978-0-07-044093-7.
- Musa, John D. (1999). Software reliability engineering: more reliable software, faster development and testing. New York: McGraw-Hill. ISBN 978-0-07-913271-0.
