= Reliability, availability, maintainability and safety =

Engineering characterization of a product or system

In engineering, reliability, availability, maintainability and safety (RAMS) is used to characterize a product or system:

- Reliability: Ability to perform a specific function and may be given as design reliability or operational reliability
- Availability: Ability to keep a functioning state in the given environment
- Maintainability: Ability to be timely and easily maintained (including servicing, inspection and check, repair and/or modification)
- Safety: Ability not to harm people, the environment, or any assets during a whole life cycle.

== See also ==
- Systems engineering
- Dependability
- Failure mode
- Failure rate
- Failure mode, effects, and criticality analysis (FMECA)
- Hazard analysis and critical control points
- High availability
- Risk assessment
- Reliability-centered maintenance
- Safety instrumented system
- Safety integrity level
- Reliability, availability and serviceability (RAS)
- Fault injection
