= Design review based on failure mode =

Quality control methodology

Design review based on failure mode (DRBFM) is a tool originally developed by the Toyota Motor Corporation. This tool was developed based on the philosophy that design problems occur when changes are made to existing engineering designs that have already been proven successful.

== Methodology ==
DRBFM methodology was developed by Tatsuhiko Yoshimura, a Quality Expert and a professor at Japan's Kyushu University. Yoshimura knew that design problems occur when changes are made without the proper level of supporting documentation. Using the philosophy of preventative measures (Mizenboushi), he created his own philosophy of DRBFM. Dr. Tatsuhiko Yoshimura supported the development and usage of DRBFM at many companies. He believes companies that implement the usage of DRBFM will be a better company. He believes the implementation of DRBFM requires discipline and engagement of everyone to the one goal of adding value to the customer by meeting engineering functional requirements and customer expectations.

The philosophy of DRBFM centers on three concepts:

- Good design
- Good discussion
- Good dissection

The DRBFM methodology is now a recognized documented process by SAE (Society of Automotive Engineers) and also by AIAG (Automotive Industry Action Group). SAE J2886 DRBFM Recommended Practice was published in 2013 and the AIAG DRBFM Reference Guide was published in September 2014. Bill Haughey is the chair of both the SAE and AIAG committees to ensure a consistent application of the DRBFM process within both documents.

=== Good design ===
The basis for reliability is not to change a design; therefore, Mr. Yoshimura believes that if a design changes, the change should occur in small increments. Disturbance to a design is caused by the discontinuity of implementing changes affecting the interfaces between parts and interactions between systems. The design should not be changed in two different places simultaneously, because making too many changes too fast has the potential to result in failures faster than our capacity to detect them. One key to successful change is to make changes visible.

=== Good discussion ===
In discussions we should concentrate on the proposed changes to a design. If a proven good design is applied to future products, then the risk of failure is low; however, if changes are made to the existing design, then the probability of failure is increased.

Mr. Yoshimura advises individuals to work to understand the changes as opposed to trivializing them. He also advises that validation testing can help to identify design weaknesses; but, he also states that good discussions held at preliminary design reviews can achieve the same result. The good discussion that Mr. Yoshimura refers to here is also known as DRBFM (Design Review Based on Failure Modes).

The analysis for DRBFM is modeled after a linkage between a good design review and FMEA. A comprehensive, well-done FMEA can be considered one of the inputs (plus many other preparations sheets defined in the methodology) to decide the scope of a DRBFM but an FMEA is not required since the focus is based on the changes and interfaces. DRBFM is implemented based on novelty of change at any level of the product (design, process, supplier, etc.). The intent of the DRBFM is to make these changes visible by discussing them at length, as well as every possible concern for failure that may potentially occur - anything that impacts quality, cost, or delivery.

=== Good dissection ===
The third part of the GD^{3} concept. One objective of a good design review is to examine the results of validation testing, making all product weaknesses visible. This examination involves applying another GD^{3} concept, design review based on test results (DRBTR). When applying DRBTR, we must, wherever possible, observe the product test before, during and after completion. DRBTR looks for the validation (test) engineer to lead the review of a DRBTR review to exam the tested part and look for buds of problems that are about to happen (test failures are evident). DRBTR encourages the designer and test engineer to discuss potential problems (observations) or weaknesses from a cross functional multi-perspective approach, and to share this information. DRBTR has the designer observing actual test pieces and discussing test results in open discussions, such as design reviews. Furthermore, when dissecting test results, one must consider manufacturing variation, test profile and expected quality and reliability targets of the product. This process is defined in detail in Bill Haughey's e-book.

== See also ==
- Failure mode and effects analysis (FMEA)
- DFMEA
- Design review
