= Discrimination ratio =

In Six Sigma, the discrimination ratio or reliability design index is a performance metric of attribute agreement analysis which assesses the level of agreement between how well the appraisers or inspectors can differentiate between acceptable and unacceptable items.
