= Process decision program chart =

Contingency planning techniques

Process Decision Program Chart (PDPC) is a technique designed to help prepare contingency plans. The emphasis of the PDPC is to identify the consequential impact of failure on activity plans, and create appropriate contingency plans to limit risks. Process diagrams and planning tree diagrams are extended by a couple of levels when the PDPC is applied to the bottom level tasks on those diagrams.

== Methodology ==
From the bottom level of some activity box, the PDPC adds levels for:

1. identifying what can go wrong (failure mode or risks)
2. consequences of that failure (effect or consequence)
3. possible countermeasures (risk mitigation action plan)

== Similar techniques ==
- The PDPC is similar to the failure mode and effects analysis (FMEA) in that both identify risks, consequences of failure, and contingency actions. The FMEA adds prioritized risk levels through rating relative risk for each potential failure point.
- Evaporating Cloud is a visually similar technique that is used for Conflict Management and Problem Solving. It follows the flow of data, either horizontally or vertically, breaking Ideas into increments of change to be easy to follow.
