= Reliability prediction for electronic components =

A prediction of reliability is an important element in the process of selecting equipment for use by telecommunications service providers and other buyers of electronic equipment, and it is essential during the design stage of engineering systems life cycle. Reliability is a measure of the frequency of equipment failures as a function of time. Reliability has a major impact on maintenance and repair costs and on the continuity of service.

Every product has a failure rate, λ which is the number of units failing per unit time. This failure rate changes throughout the life of the product. It is the manufacturer's aim to ensure that product in the “infant mortality period” does not get to the customer. This leaves a product with a useful life period during which failures occur randomly i.e., λ is constant, and finally a wear-out period, usually beyond the product's useful life, where λ is increasing.

== Definition of reliability ==
A practical definition of reliability is “the probability that a piece of equipment operating under specified conditions shall perform satisfactorily for a given period of time”. The reliability is a number between 0 and 1 respectively.

== MTBF and MTTF ==
MTBF (mean operating time between failures) applies to equipment that is going to be repaired and returned to service, MTTF (mean time to failure) applies to parts that will be thrown away on failing. During the ‘useful life period’ assuming a constant failure rate, MTBF is the inverse of the failure rate and the terms can be used interchangeably.

== Importance of reliability prediction ==
Reliability predictions:

- Help assess the effect of product reliability on the maintenance activity and on the quantity of spare units required for acceptable field performance of any particular system. For example, predictions of the frequency of unit level maintenance actions can be obtained. Reliability prediction can be used to size spare populations.
- Provide necessary input to system-level reliability models. System-level reliability models can subsequently be used to predict, for example, frequency of system outages in steady-state, frequency of system outages during early life, expected downtime per year, and system availability.
- Provide necessary input to unit and system-level life cycle cost analyses. Life cycle cost studies determine the cost of a product over its entire life. Therefore, how often a unit will have to be replaced needs to be known. Inputs to this process include unit and system failure rates. This includes how often units and systems fail during the first year of operation as well as in later years.
- Assist in deciding which product to purchase from a list of competing products. As a result, it is essential that reliability predictions be based on a common procedure.
- Can be used to set factory test standards for products requiring a reliability test. Reliability predictions help determine how often the system should fail.
- Are needed as input to the analysis of complex systems such as switching systems and digital cross-connect systems. It is necessary to know how often different parts of the system are going to fail even for redundant components.
- Can be used in design trade-off studies. For example, a supplier could look at a design with many simple devices and compare it to a design with fewer devices that are newer but more complex. The unit with fewer devices is usually more reliable.
- Can be used to set achievable in-service performance standards against which to judge actual performance and stimulate action.

The telecommunications industry has devoted much time over the years to concentrate on developing reliability models for electronic equipment. One such tool is the automated reliability prediction procedure (ARPP), which is an Excel-spreadsheet software tool that automates the reliability prediction procedures in SR-332, Reliability prediction procedure for electronic equipment. FD-ARPP-01 provides suppliers and manufacturers with a tool for making reliability prediction procedure (RPP) calculations. It also provides a means for understanding RPP calculations through the capability of interactive examples provided by the user.

The RPP views electronic systems as hierarchical assemblies. Systems are constructed from units that, in turn, are constructed from devices. The methods presented predict reliability at these three hierarchical levels:

1. Device: A basic component (or part)
2. Unit: Any assembly of devices. This may include, but is not limited to, circuit packs, modules, plug-in units, racks, power supplies, and ancillary equipment. Unless otherwise dictated by maintenance considerations, a unit will usually be the lowest level of replaceable assemblies/devices. The RPP is aimed primarily at reliability prediction of units.
3. Serial System: Any assembly of units for which the failure of any single unit will cause a failure of the system.

== Data-driven reliability predictions ==
Data-driven models for reliability prediction utilise data acquired from tests to failure on electronic components by establishing relationships between the different variables presented in the data. As such relationships can be complex, data-driven models often require computations in high dimensions, which means that a large dataset is needed to optimize the output of the model.

== Physics-based reliability predictions ==
Physics based reliability predictions use physical equations and formulae to determine failure. This approach requires precise knowledge of the degradation process and the physical properties to ensure accuracy. These models often utilise numerical simulations to infer the quantities needed by the model.
