= Specialty engineering =

In the domain of systems engineering, Specialty Engineering is defined as and includes the engineering disciplines that are not typical of the main engineering effort. More common engineering efforts in systems engineering such as hardware, software, and human factors engineering may be used as major elements in a majority of systems engineering efforts and therefore are not viewed as "special".

Examples of specialty engineering include electromagnetic interference, safety, and physical security.

Less common engineering domains such as electromagnetic interference, electrical grounding, safety, security, electrical power filtering/uninterruptible supply, manufacturability, and environmental engineering may be included in systems engineering efforts where they have been identified to address special system implementations. These less common but just as important engineering efforts are then viewed as "specialty engineering".

However, if the specific system has a standard implementation of environmental or security for example, the situation is reversed and the human factors engineering or hardware/software engineering may be the "specialty engineering" domain.

The key take away is; the context of the system engineering project and unique needs of the project are fundamental when thinking of what are the specialty engineering efforts.

The benefit of citing "specialty engineering" in planning is the notice to all team levels that special management and science factors may need to be accounted for and may influence the project.

Specialty engineering may be cited by commercial entities and others to specify their unique abilities.
