= Sneak circuit analysis =

Sneak circuit analysis (SCA), also called sneak path analysis, is a technique for evaluating hardware systems and software programs to identify latent circuits and conditions that could inhibit functions or cause undesired functions to occur. These conditions are not caused by failures, but rather they represent conditions inadvertently designed into the hardware system or software program.
