= Failure reporting, analysis, and corrective action system =

Failure analysis system

A failure reporting, analysis, and corrective action system (FRACAS) is a system, sometimes carried out using software, that provides a process for reporting, classifying, analyzing failures, and planning corrective actions in response to those failures.

It is typically used in an industrial environment to collect data, record and analyze system failures. A FRACAS system may attempt to manage multiple failure reports and produces a history of failure and corrective actions. FRACAS records the problems related to a product or process and their associated root causes and failure analyses to assist in identifying and implementing corrective actions.

== Method ==
The FRACAS method was developed by the US Govt. and first introduced for use by the US Navy and all department of defense agencies in 1985. The FRACAS process is a closed loop with the following steps:

1. Failure Reporting (FR). The failures and the faults related to a system, a piece of equipment, a piece of software or a process are formally reported through a standard form (Defect Report, Failure Report).
2. Analysis (A). Perform analysis in order to identify the root cause of failure.
3. Corrective Actions (CA). Identify, implement and verify corrective actions to prevent further recurrence of the failure.

== Output ==
Common FRACAS outputs may include: Part Number, Part Name, OEM, Field MTBF, MTBR, MTTR, spares consumption, reliability growth, failure/incidents distribution by type, location, part no., serial no, symptom, etc.
