= Failure cause =

Defects which are the underlying cause of a failure

Failure causes are defects in design, process, quality, or part application, which are the underlying cause of a failure or which initiate a process which leads to failure. Where failure depends on the user of the product or process, then human error must be considered.

== Component failure/failure modes ==
A part failure mode is the way in which a component failed "functionally" on the component level. Often a part has only a few failure modes. For example, a relay may fail to open or close contacts on demand. The failure mechanism that caused this can be of many different kinds, and often multiple factors play a role at the same time. They include corrosion, welding of contacts due to an abnormal electric current, return spring fatigue failure, unintended command failure, dust accumulation and blockage of mechanism, etc. Seldom only one cause (hazard) can be identified that creates system failures. The real root causes can in theory in most cases be traced back to some kind of human error, e.g. design failure, operational errors, management failures, maintenance induced failures, specification failures, etc.

== Failure scenario ==
A scenario is the complete identified possible sequence and combination of events, failures (failure modes), conditions, system states, leading to an end (failure) system state. It starts from causes (if known) leading to one particular end effect (the system failure condition). A failure scenario is for a system the same as the failure mechanism is for a component. Both result in a failure mode (state) of the system / component.

Rather than the simple description of symptoms that many product users or process participants might use, the term failure scenario / mechanism refers to a rather complete description, including the preconditions under which failure occurs, how the thing was being used, proximate and ultimate/final causes (if known), and any subsidiary or resulting failures that result.

The term is part of the engineering lexicon, especially of engineers working to test and debug products or processes. Carefully observing and describing failure conditions, identifying whether failures are reproducible or transient, and hypothesizing what combination of conditions and sequence of events led to failure is part of the process of fixing design flaws or improving future iterations. The term may be applied to mechanical systems failure.

== Types of failure causes ==
=== Mechanical failure ===
Some types of mechanical failure mechanisms are: excessive deflection, buckling, ductile fracture, brittle fracture, impact, creep, relaxation, thermal shock, wear, corrosion, stress corrosion cracking, and various types of fatigue. Each produces a different type of fracture surface, and other indicators near the fracture surface(s). The way the product is loaded, and the loading history are also important factors which determine the outcome. Of critical importance is design geometry because stress concentrations can magnify the applied load locally to very high levels, and from which cracks usually grow.

Over time, as more is understood about a failure, the failure cause evolves from a description of symptoms and outcomes (that is, effects) to a systematic and relatively abstract model of how, when, and why the failure comes about (that is, causes).

The more complex the product or situation, the more necessary a good understanding of its failure cause is to ensuring its proper operation (or repair). Cascading failures, for example, are particularly complex failure causes. Edge cases and corner cases are situations in which complex, unexpected, and difficult-to-debug problems often occur.

=== Failure by corrosion ===
Materials can be degraded by their environment by corrosion processes, such as rusting in the case of iron and steel. Such processes can also be affected by load in the mechanisms of stress corrosion cracking and environmental stress cracking.

== See also ==
- Failure analysis
- Failure mode and effects analysis (FMEA)
- Failure modes, effects, and diagnostic analysis (FMEDA)
- Failure rate
- Forensic engineering
  - Forensic electrical engineering
- Hazard analysis
- Ultimate failure
