= APJ =

APJ may refer to:

- The Astrophysical Journal
- Apelin receptor
- Absolute probability judgement
- Asia-Pacific
- A. P. J. Abdul Kalam, (1931–2015), former president of India
- Peach Aviation ICAO Airlines Code
- Ngari Burang Airport IATA Airport code
