= Shearwater Research =

Canadian manufacturer of dive computers and rebreather electronics

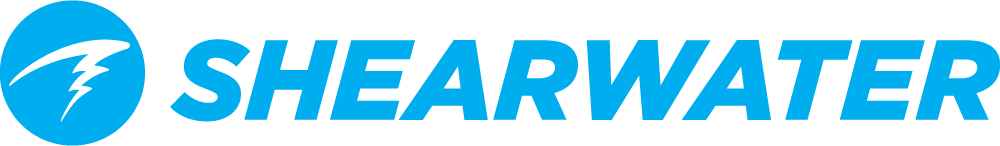
- Industry: Corporation
- Founded: 2004
- Headquarters: Richmond, British Columbia, Canada
- Key people: Bruce Partridge, founder
- Products: dive computers, rebreather electronics
- Number of employees: 50 (December, 2017)
- Website: Shearwater.com
- Footnotes / references All products meet CE, FCC and IC international standards.

Shearwater Research is a Canadian manufacturer of dive computers and rebreather electronics for technical diving.

== History ==
In 2004, Shearwater Research was founded by Bruce Partridge who produced their products in a spare bedroom at his home. As of 2014, Shearwater was producing thousands of dive computers per year in a manufacturing facility with twenty employees. From the beginning the company sought to develop products that are simple to use and easy to read underwater.

Shearwater Research began by building controller boards for the Innerspace Systems Corp (ISC) Megalodon rebreathers in 2004. There was a problem with the configuration and by the end of 2005, ISC was no longer offering the Shearwater electronics package. Since that time, the initial issues have been resolved and Shearwater electronics are again available for use on the ISC Megalodons.

Shearwater decompression computers began with an implementation of the Bühlmann decompression algorithm with gradient factors into their Shearwater GF in the Spring of 2006. It was available in either the partial pressure of oxygen with decompression or control versions.

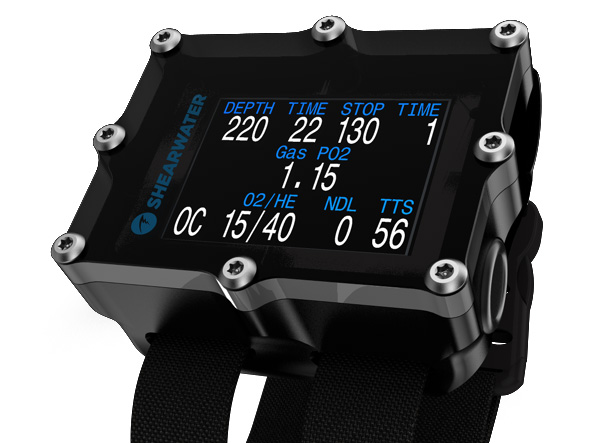
Predator OC/CC External

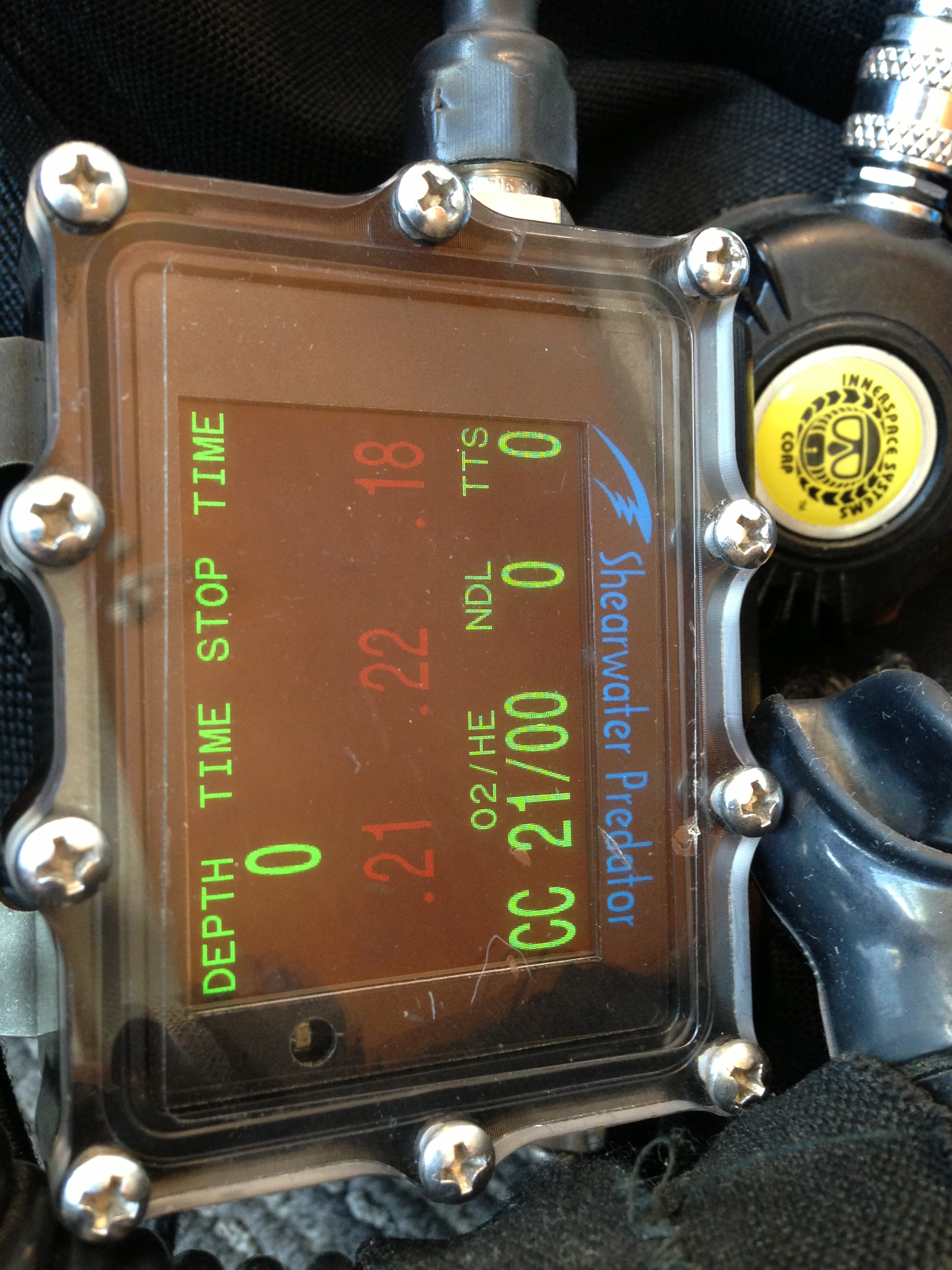
A Shearwater Predator dive computer attached to a rebreather. Image shows screen in reverse orientation that allows the diver to wear the display on the right hand side

With the release of the Predator in 2009, Shearwater moved away from the older LCD technology to the use of newer technology OLED displays in their computers. This was the first color OLED diving computer available in the market with a user replaceable battery. Power was a major limiting factor in the development process to include the OLED technology.

With the Predator, Shearwater also introduced bluetooth to allow easier syncing with their desktop software. Their reason for the move to bluetooth was to make a computer that could be used on multiple operating systems. The Predator's two button design has been called "intuitive and easy to use". The top-of-the-line Predator will also allow for up to five breathing gases for the rebreather and up to five bail-out gasses. The user can make gas switches on the computer at any point during the dive.

Shearwater received their certification for ISO 9001-2008 in 2010 and all their products are compliant with CE, Federal Communications Commission (FCC) and IC international standards.

In 2011, Shearwater announced that they had licensed a technique to thermally monitor the condition of rebreather carbon dioxide absorbent canisters developed by the United States Navy Experimental Diving Unit. In collaboration with rEvo rebreathers, they were able to show that the thermal canister CO_{2} monitor would work with Shearwater's Predator dive computer.

Shearwater has continued to develop new ways to calculate decompression in their equipment by releasing an implementation of the Varying Permeability Model (VPM-B/GFS) in 2011. The "GFS" is for Gradient Factor Surfacing and indicates the combination where VPM and GF models are compared and the longer time utilized for the displayed profile.

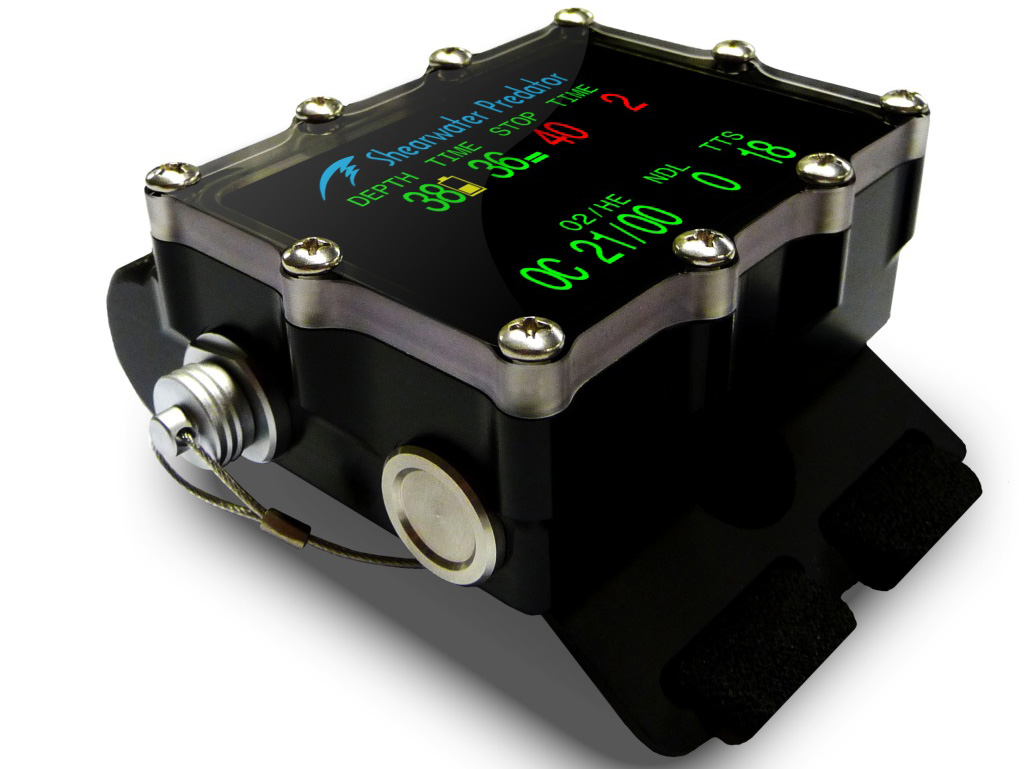
Petrel OC/CC Standalone

The Shearwater Petrel has been described as the "Predator with improvements". The Petrel was designed to allow a user serviceable standard AA battery to supply the power it needs for calculations, and OLED display with automatic brightness changing to suit ambient lighting. The unit is 40% smaller than the Predator. The Petrel includes both the Bühlmann algorithm and their VPM-B/GFS algorithm. The Petrel also extends the profile data storage that was previously available from 200 to approximately 1000 hours.

With the release of the Petrel, Shearwater also improved the educational materials available to their owners.

In 2013, Shearwater was presented with the International System Safety Society Award for safety in "Scientific Research & Development" at the 31st International System Safety Conference in Boston.

Shearwater's NERD or Near Eye Remote Display is a head-up display that places the divers information in front of their eyes. The Shearwater NERD was released at Dive 2013 in Birmingham, UK.

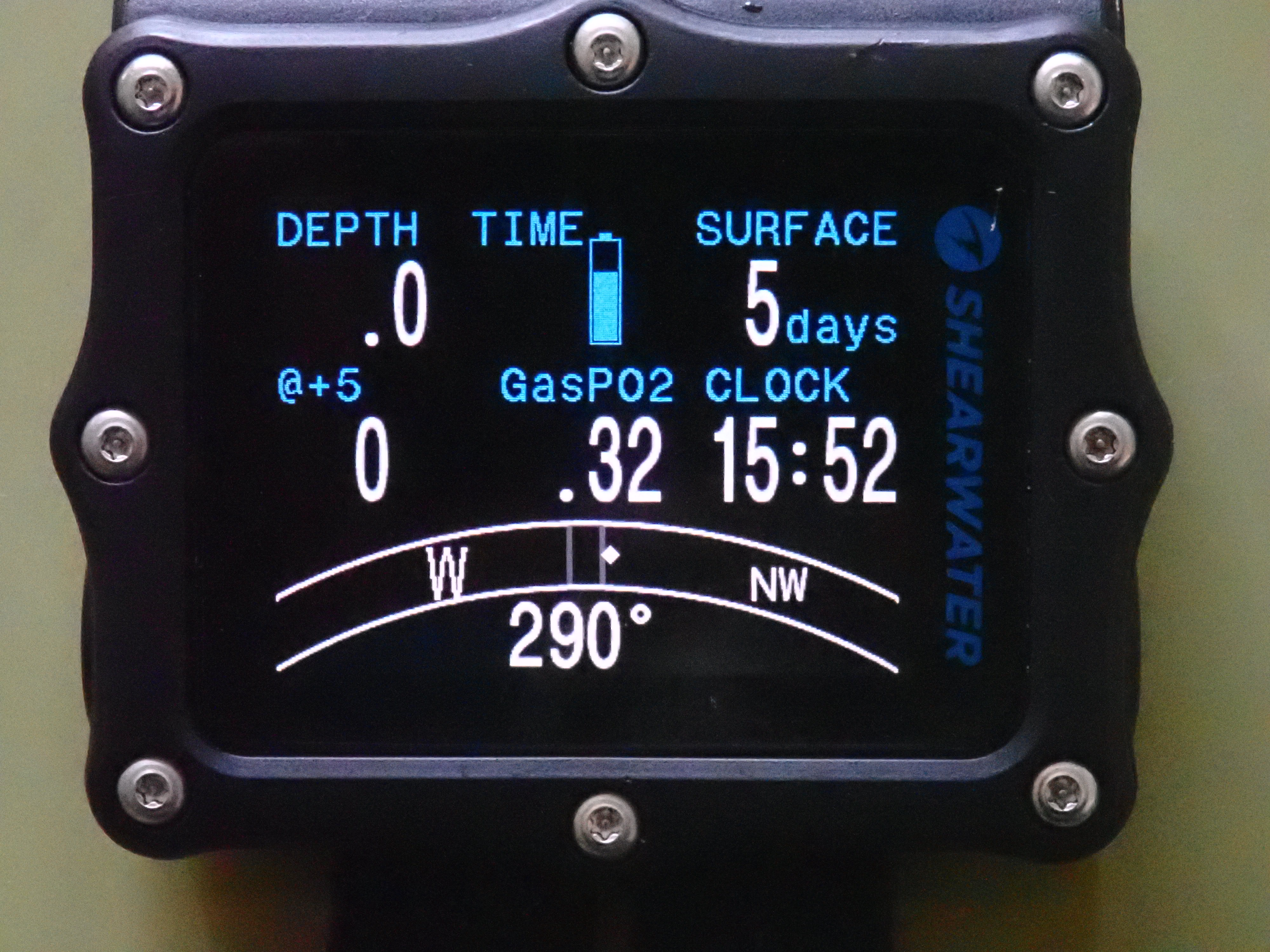
Shearwater Perdix in compass mode

In 2015, the Perdix wrist mounted dive computer was released. The Perdix is similar to the Petrel but has a 30% longer battery life and a thinner and lower profile. The computer was named after the grey partridge Perdix perdix. Unlike the Petrel, the Perdix is only available in a stand-alone configuration and does not have a version that can be connected to a rebreather.

In 2016, the Perdix AI was released. It built on the success of the Perdix by adding air integration features designed to function in conjunction with Pelagic Pressure Systems wireless gas pressure transmitters. The Perdix AI allows for 2 cylinder pressures to be displayed simultaneously.

In 2017, Shearwater launched the NERD 2. A successor to the original NERD heads-up dive computer, the NERD 2 eliminated the brain box from the NERD system, incorporating all of the electronics into the eyepiece. The NERD 2 contains a rechargeable lithium-ion battery, heads-up compass, and dual air integration capability. Unlike the original NERD, the NERD 2 is available in a stand-alone model, making it practical for open circuit diving for the first time.

The Teric which was launched in May 2018, is Shearwater's first dive computer in a watch format.

== Safety outreach ==
In 2010, Shearwater was one of the founding manufacturers for the Rebreather Education and Safety Association. Shearwater's Bruce Partridge served as Secretary for the founding board of the organization.

Partridge also presented at the Rebreather Forum 3 meeting held in 2012. He presented on the use of information technology with focus on human factors in equipment design.

Shearwater is also a sponsor for the diving research efforts of the Rubicon Foundation.

In 2016 Shearwater funded a rebreather sorb absorption research study by Harvey and colleagues.

== Research and development partnerships ==
In July 2024 Shearater announced availability of Avelo mode on the Teric model dive computers. This feature is also available on Shearwater Tern TX, Peregrine TX, and Perdix 2 dive computers via firmware downloads and an unlock code.

In late 2024 Shearwater announced an R&D partnership with Avelo Labs to develop the Avelo Jetpack buoyancy control system.

== Exploration support ==
A Shearwater Predator was used to calculate decompression on a 2010 expedition that led to the identification of HMS Snaefell that went down on July 5, 1941.

Lance Robb utilized an ISC Megalodon rebreather with a Shearwater Predator in a 2010 expedition to explore Osprey Reef at a depth of 156 m (512 ft).

Shearwater also supported research by the University of Connecticut and Ocean Opportunity to explore the Tongue of the Ocean. This project, funded by the National Geographic Society/ Waitt Grants Program to explore the mesophotic zone between 200 ft (60 m) and 500 ft (150 m) carried The Explorers Club flag number 172. The Shearwater electronics were utilized to record the diver profiles.

=== Algorithms ===
- Bühlmann decompression algorithm (ZH 16) with user selected gradient factors is the standard algorithm. The settings are selected by the user and there are no hidden or proprietary factors.
- Varying Permeability Model (VPM-B) is available as an option.
- Thalmann algorithm (VVAL-18) is available to the US Navy.

== Awards ==
- In 2013, Shearwater was presented with the International System Safety Society Award for safety in "Scientific Research & Development" at the 31st International System Safety Conference in Boston.
- The EUROTEK 2014 Innovation Award, for manufacturing "an advanced or technical diving product or service that has enabled you to further your diving or made your diving safer" was granted to Bruce and Lynn Partridge of Shearwater Research for the Petrel and NERD.
