= TESEO =

Tecnica Empirica Stima Errori Operatori (TESEO) is a technique in the field of Human reliability Assessment (HRA), that evaluates the probability of a human error occurring throughout the completion of a specific task. From such analyses measures can then be taken to reduce the likelihood of errors occurring within a system and therefore lead to an improvement in the overall levels of safety. There exist three primary reasons for conducting an HRA; error identification, error quantification and error reduction. As there exist a number of techniques used for such purposes, they can be split into one of two classifications; first generation techniques and second generation techniques. First generation techniques work on the basis of the simple dichotomy of ‘fits/doesn’t fit’ in the matching of the error situation in context with related error identification and quantification and second generation techniques are more theory based in their assessment and quantification of errors. ‘HRA techniques have been utilised in a range of industries including healthcare, engineering, nuclear, transportation and business sector; each technique has varying uses within different disciplines.

This is a time based model that describes the probability of a system operator's failure as a multiplicative function of 5 main factors. These factors are as follows:

1. K1: The type of task to be executed
2. K2: The time available to the operator to complete the task
3. K3: The operator's level of experience/characteristics
4. K4: The operator's state of mind
5. K5: The environmental and ergonomic conditions prevalent

Using these figures, an overall Human Error Probability (HEP) can be calculated with the formulation provided below:

K1 x K2 x K3 x K4 x K5

The specific value of each of the above functions can be obtained by consulting standard tables that take account of the method in which the HEP is derived.

== Background ==
Developed in 1980 by Bello and Colombari, TESEO created with the intention of using it for the purpose of conducting HRA of process industries. The methodology is relatively straightforward and is easy to use but is also limited; it is useful for quick overview HRA assessments, as opposed to highly detailed and in-depth assessments. Within the field of HRA, there is a lack of theoretical foundation for the technique, as is widely acknowledged throughout.

== TESEO Methodology ==
When putting this technique into practice, it is necessary for the designated HRA assessor to thoroughly consider the task requiring assessment and therefore also consider the value for Kn that applies in the context. Once this value has been decided upon, the tables, previously mentioned, are then consulted from which a related value for each of the identified factors is found to allow the HEP to be calculated.

== Worked Example ==
Provided below is an example of how TESEO methodology can be used in practice; each of the stages of the process described above are worked through in order.

=== Context ===
An operator works on a production transfer line that operates between two tanks. His role is to ensure the correct product is selected for transfer from one tanker to the other by operating remotely located valves. The essential valves must be opened to perform the task.

The operator possesses average experience for this role. The individual is in a control room that has a relatively noisy environment and poor lighting. There is a time window of five minutes for the required task.

=== Method ===
The figures for the HEP calculation, obtained from the relevant tables, are given as follows:

- The type of task to be executed: K1 = 0.01
- Time available to complete the task: K2 = 0.5
- Level of experience: K3 = 1
- Operator's state of mind: K4 = 1
- Environmental and ergonomic conditions: K5 = 10

The calculation for the final HEP figure is therefore calculated as:

K1 x K2 x K3 x K4 x K5
=0.01 x 0.5 x 1 x 1 x 10
= 0.05

=== Result ===
Given the result of this calculation, it can be deduced that were the control room notified of the valves’ positions and if the microclimate was better, K5 would be unity, and therefore the HEP would be 0.005, representing an improvement of 1 order of magnitude.

== Advantages of TESEO ==
The technique of TESEO is typically quick and straightforward in comparison to other HRA tools, not only in producing a final result, but also in sensitivity analysis e.g., it is useful in identifying the effects improvements in human factors have on overall human reliability of a task. It is widely applicable to various control room designs or with procedures with varying characteristics.

== Disadvantages of TESEO ==
There is limited work published with regards to the theoretical foundations of this technique, in particular relating to the justification of the five factor methodology. Regardless of the situation, it remains to be assumed that these 5 factors are suffice for an accurate assessment of human performance; as no other factors are considered, this suggests that to solely use these 5 factors to adequately describe the full range of error producing conditions fails to be highly realistic. Further to this, the values of K1-5 are unsubstantiated and the suggested multiplicative relationship has no sufficient theoretical or empirical evidence for justification purposes.
