= International System Safety Society =

- Nickname: ISSS
- Formation: December 4, 1963
- Founder: Roger Lockwood
- Founded at: University of Southern California, Los Angeles
- Type: 501(c)(6) Nonprofit
- Headquarters: St. Paul, MN
- President: Pam Alte
- Executive Director: Lee Helgen
- Website: www.system-safety.org
- Formerly called: Aerospace System Safety Society

The International System Safety Society (ISSS) is a non-profit professional organization for system safety engineers. ISSS was established in 1963 to support the development of system safety as a distinct engineering discipline.

ISSS has local chapters in several states across the United States, as well as in Singapore and Canada. The society currently has members from over 25 countries across the world.

== History ==
The event recognized as the founding of the Society occurred on December 4, 1963, in the main lecture hall at the School of Aviation Safety on the University of Southern California campus in Los Angeles. The gathering consisted of about 40 individuals, including many students and others from the USAF Aerospace Safety Center, some USC faculty members, along with system safety representatives of the numerous aerospace companies located in the area.

== Events ==
Since the first event in 1972, the society has sponsored the annual International System Safety Conference. The society also sponsors annual member awards which are presented at the annual awards banquet during the International System Safety Conference. In addition, the society and local chapters organize webinars and symposia for society members.

ISSS is also one of the sponsoring societies for the annual Reliability and Maintainability Symposium. The society is also a sponsor of the Board of Certified Safety Professionals (BCSP) Global Learning Summit.

== Publications ==
Journal of System Safety
- Discipline: System safety
- Language: English
- Edited by: Charles Muniak

Publication details
- Former name: Hazard Prevention
- History: 1965–present
- Publisher: International System Safety Society
- Frequency: Triannually
- Open access: Yes

Standard abbreviations
- ISO 4: J. Syst. Saf.

Indexing
- ISSN: 2832-3041 (print); 2832-305X (web)
- LCCN: 85644652
- OCLC no.: 4877745
- Hazard Prevention
- ISSN: 0743-8826

Links
- Journal homepage

The society publishes the Journal of System Safety, a triannual peer-reviewed academic journal, as well as periodic member newsletters and formerly the System Safety Analysis Handbook. The journal was established in 1965 as Hazard Prevention and obtained its current name in 1999. It is considered one of the important journals in the field of reliability and safety and is one of the oldest in continuous publication. The journal seeks to advance the discipline of system safety across a wide range of application domains, including aerospace, automotive, nuclear power, and military applications. The editor-in-chief is Charles Muniak (Syracuse Safety Research). In 2022 the journal began transitioning to a gold open access publishing model with no article processing charges.

== See also ==
- System safety
- Safety engineering
- Risk management
