= Alan D. Swain =

American human factors engineer

Dr. Alan D. Swain III (Nov. 21, 1923 – Nov. 2, 2021) was a human factors engineer who specialized in weapons systems and nuclear power plants. He was a Distinguished Member of Technical Staff at Sandia National Laboratories, where he developed the technique for human error-rate prediction (THERP). According to a bibliometrics analysis performed in 2020, Swain is the most highly cited author in the field of human reliability analysis.

Swain co-authored the Handbook of Human Reliability Analysis with Emphasis on Nuclear Power Plant Applications, which became a basic guide for many in the human factors field.

== Education ==
Swain graduated from Marion Harding High School in 1941. He received an MA in 1948, and a Ph.D. in psychology in 1953, from The Ohio State University.

== Career ==
Swain served as a radioman-navigator in the United States Navy during World War II, from 1942 to 1945.

In 1961, Swain joined Sandia National Laboratories as a human factors engineer. At Sandia, Swain developed the technique for human error-rate prediction (THERP), and collected human performance data for the Sandia Human Error Rate Bank (SHERB).

== Awards ==
Swain was a Fellow in the Human Factors and Ergonomics Society (HFES).

In 1984, Swain received the HFES Jack A. Kraft Innovator award
