= Human reliability =

Factor in safety, ergonomics and system resilience

In the field of human factors and ergonomics, human reliability (also known as human performance or HU) is the probability that a human performs a task to a sufficient standard. Reliability of humans can be affected by many factors such as age, physical health, mental state, attitude, emotions, personal propensity for certain mistakes, and cognitive biases.

Human reliability is important to the resilience of socio-technical systems, and has implications for fields like manufacturing, medicine and nuclear power. Attempts made to decrease human error and increase reliability in human interaction with technology include user-centered design and error-tolerant design.

== Factors Affecting Human Performance ==
Human error, human performance, and human reliability are especially important to consider when work is performed in a complex and high-risk environment.

Strategies for dealing with performance-shaping factors such as psychological stress, cognitive load, fatigue include heuristics and biases such as confirmation bias, availability heuristic, and frequency bias.

== Human reliability analysis ==
A variety of methods exist for human reliability analysis (HRA). Two general classes of methods are those based on probabilistic risk assessment (PRA) and those based on a cognitive theory of control.

=== PRA-based techniques ===
One method for analyzing human reliability is a straightforward extension of probabilistic risk assessment (PRA): in the same way that equipment can fail in a power plant, so can a human operator commit errors. In both cases, an analysis (functional decomposition for equipment and task analysis for humans) would articulate a level of detail for which failure or error probabilities can be assigned. This basic idea is behind the Technique for Human Error Rate Prediction (THERP). THERP is intended to generate human error probabilities that would be incorporated into a PRA. The Accident Sequence Evaluation Program (ASEP) human reliability procedure is a simplified form of THERP; an associated computational tool is Simplified Human Error Analysis Code (SHEAN). More recently, the US Nuclear Regulatory Commission has published the Standardized Plant Analysis Risk – Human Reliability Analysis (SPAR-H) method to take account of the potential for human error.

=== Cognitive control based techniques ===
Erik Hollnagel has developed this line of thought in his work on the Contextual Control Model (COCOM) and the Cognitive Reliability and Error Analysis Method (CREAM). COCOM models human performance as a set of control modes—strategic (based on long-term planning), tactical (based on procedures), opportunistic (based on present context), and scrambled (random) – and proposes a model of how transitions between these control modes occur. This model of control mode transition consists of a number of factors, including the human operator's estimate of the outcome of the action (success or failure), the time remaining to accomplish the action (adequate or inadequate), and the number of simultaneous goals of the human operator at that time. CREAM is a human reliability analysis method that is based on COCOM.

=== Related techniques ===
Related techniques in safety engineering and reliability engineering include failure mode and effects analysis, hazop, fault tree, and SAPHIRE (Systems Analysis Programs for Hands-on Integrated Reliability Evaluations).

=== Human Factors Analysis and Classification System (HFACS) ===
The Human Factors Analysis and Classification System (HFACS) was developed initially as a framework to understand the role of human error in aviation accidents. It is based on James Reason's Swiss cheese model of human error in complex systems. HFACS distinguishes between the "active failures" of unsafe acts, and "latent failures" of preconditions for unsafe acts, unsafe supervision, and organizational influences. These categories were developed empirically on the basis of many aviation accident reports.

"Unsafe acts" are performed by the human operator "on the front line" (e.g., the pilot, the air traffic controller, or the driver). Unsafe acts can be either errors (in perception, decision making or skill-based performance) or violations. Violations, or the deliberate disregard for rules and procedures, can be routine or exceptional. Routine violations occur habitually and are usually tolerated by the organization or authority. Exceptional violations are unusual and often extreme. For example, driving 60 mph in a 55-mph speed limit zone is a routine violation, while driving 130 mph in the same zone is exceptional.

There are two types of preconditions for unsafe acts: those that relate to the human operator's internal state and those that relate to the human operator's practices or ways of working. Adverse internal states include those related to physiology (e.g., illness) and mental state (e.g., mentally fatigued, distracted). A third aspect of 'internal state' is really a mismatch between the operator's ability and the task demands. Four types of unsafe supervision are: inadequate supervision; planned inappropriate operations; failure to correct a known problem; and supervisory violations.

Organizational influences include those related to resources management (e.g., inadequate human or financial resources), organizational climate (structures, policies, and culture), and organizational processes (such as procedures, schedules, oversight).

== See also ==
- Absolute probability judgement – Technique used in the field of human reliability assessment
- ATHEANA – Technique used in the field of human reliability assessment (A Technique for Human Event Analysis)
- Human error assessment and reduction technique (HEART), a technique used in the field of human reliability
- Influence diagrams approach
- Latent human error – Term used in safety work and accident prevention
- Team error – Type of error
- TESEO (Tecnica Empirica Stima Errori Operatori)
- Incident pit, conceptual model from diving for explaining incident development and recovery
- Success Likelihood Index Method
