= ATHEANA =

Technique used in the field of human reliability assessment

A Technique for Human Event Analysis (ATHEANA) is a technique used in the field of human reliability assessment (HRA). The purpose of ATHEANA is to evaluate the probability of human error while performing a specific task. From such analyses, preventative measures can then be taken to reduce human errors within a system and therefore lead to improvements in the overall level of safety.

There exist three primary reasons for conducting a HRA; error identification, error quantification and error reduction. As there exist a number of techniques used for such purposes, they can be split into one of two classifications; first generation techniques and second generation techniques.

First generation techniques work on the basis of the simple dichotomy of ‘fits/doesn’t fit’ in the matching of the error situation in context with related error identification and quantification and second generation techniques are more theory based in their assessment and quantification of errors. ‘HRA techniques have been utilised in a range of industries including healthcare, engineering, nuclear, transportation and business sector; each technique has varying uses within different disciplines.

ATHEANA is used following the occurrence of an incident. The various drivers of an incident and the possible outcomes are categorised into one of the following groupings: organisational influences; performance shaping factors; error mechanisms; unsafe actions; human failure event; unacceptable outcome(s). The resultant model may indicate solutions to improve reliability, however there are no numerical aspects involved in the methodology used to construct the model. Due to this characteristic, the technique is thus not considered to be suitable for use in certain fields such as comparative design work or sensitivity analysis. The methodology of ATHEANA is not predictive but does serve as a diagnostic modelling tool. Furthermore, its lack of Human Error Probability (HEP) as an output is a marked difference of the method compared to first generation HRA methodologies. The outcome provided by ATHEANA identifies various human actions within a system while also eliciting many contextual situations within this system, which influence whether the action will be carried out successfully or will lead to failure.

== Background ==
ATHEANA is a post-incident Human Reliability Assessment (HRA) methodology developed by the US Nuclear Regulatory Commission in 2000. It was developed in the hope that certain types of human behaviour in nuclear plants and industries, which use similar processes, could be represented in a way in which they could be more easily understood. It seeks to provide a robust psychological framework to evaluate and identify Performance Shaping Factors (PSFs) - including organisational/environmental factors - which have driven incidents involving human factors, primarily with the intention of suggesting process improvement. Essentially it is a method of representing complex accident reports within a standardised structure, which may be easier to understand and communicate.

== ATHEANA methodology ==
There are seven basic steps to the ATHEANA methodology

1. Define and interpret the issue under consideration
2. Detail the required scope of analysis
3. Describe the Base case scenario including the norm of operations within the environment, considering actions and procedures.
4. Define Human Failure Events (HFE’s) and/or unsafe actions (UAs) which may affect the task in question
5. Following the identification of the HFEs, they should be further categorised into two primary groups, safe and unsafe actions (UAs). An unsafe action is an action in which the human operator concerned may fail to carry out a task or does so incorrectly and this consequently results in the unsafe operation of the system.
6. Search for deviations from the base case scenario in terms of any probable divergence in the normal environmental operating behaviour in the context of the situational scenario.
7. Preparation for applying ATHEANA
8. In recognition that the environment and the surrounding context may affect the human operator’s behaviour, the next stage of the ATHEANA methodology is to take account of what are known as error-forcing contexts (EFCs), which are then combined with performance shaping factors (PSFs), as identified in the figure provided below.

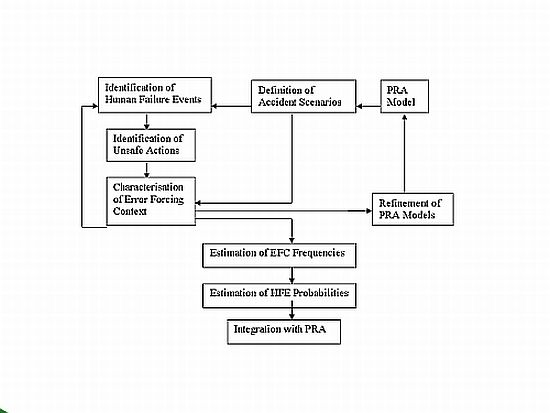

Schematic outline of ATHEANA

The formulation by which ATHEANA quantifies error is as follows:

P(HFEijr)= P(EFCi) P(UAj|EFCi) P(¯R|EFCi|UAj|Eij)

where:

- P(HFEijr): the probability of human failure event (HFEijr) occurring
- P(EFCi): the probability of error-forcing context
- P(UAj|EFCi): the probability of unsafe action within a specific context or EFC
- P(¯R|EFCi|UAj|Eij): the non-recovery probability in the EFC and given the occurrence of the unsafe action and the existence of additional evidence (Eij) following the unsafe action

== Advantages ==
- The most significant advantage of ATHEANA is that it provides a much richer and more holistic understanding of the context concerning the Human factors known to be the cause of the incident, as compared with most other first generation methods.
- It may also be alleged that carrying out this type of quantitative modelling leads to the enhancement of understanding as it requires stakeholders and decision makers to consider and discuss the contributing aspects as part of the model-building procedure.
- It increases the guarantee that the key risks associated with the Human Failure Events in question have been identified.
- Utilising the ATHEANA methodology, it is possible to estimate Human Error Probabilities considering a variety of differing factors and combinations.
- Compared to many other HRA quantification methods, ATHEANA allows for the consideration of a much wider range of performance shaping factors and also does not require that these be treated as independent. This is important as the method seeks to identify any interactions which affect the weighting of the factors of their influence on a situation

== Disadvantages ==
- The primary shortcoming of the technique is that, from a Probability Risk assessment (PRA) stance, there is no HEP produced. As a result, the ease with which this analysis can be fit into a predictive quantitative risk assessment is reduced.
- Also, while the method is apparent in categorising the human factors contributing to an incident, it fails to prioritise or establish details of the causal relationships between these factors. Thus, further work is required to be performed in order to establish the root cause (s) of an incident from a HRA perspective.
- The outcomes of the human errors under consideration are constrained by previously defined sequences of PSA accidents
- For the purposes of predictive analysis the theoretical foundations on which the ATHEANA methodology is based are considered to be ineffectual
