= Human error assessment and reduction technique =

Human error assessment and reduction technique (HEART) is a technique used in the field of human reliability assessment (HRA), for the purposes of evaluating the probability of a human error occurring throughout the completion of a specific task. From such analyses, measures can then be taken to reduce the likelihood of errors occurring within a system and therefore lead to an improvement in the overall levels of safety. There exist three primary reasons for conducting an HRA: error identification, error quantification, and error reduction. As there exist a number of techniques used for such purposes, they can be split into one of two classifications: first-generation techniques and second generation techniques. First generation techniques work on the basis of the simple dichotomy of 'fits/doesn't fit' in the matching of the error situation in context with related error identification and quantification, and second generation techniques are more theory based in their assessment and quantification of errors. HRA techniques have been used in a range of industries including healthcare, engineering, nuclear, transportation, and business sectors. Each technique has varying uses within different disciplines.

The HEART method is based upon the principle that every time a task is performed there is a possibility of failure, and that the probability of this is affected by one or more Error Producing Conditions (EPCs) – for instance: distraction, tiredness, cramped conditions etc. – to varying degrees. Factors which have a significant effect on performance are of greatest interest. These conditions can then be applied to a "best-case-scenario" estimate of the failure probability under ideal conditions, to then obtain a final error chance. This figure assists in communication of error chances with the wider risk analysis or safety case. By forcing consideration of the EPCs potentially affecting a given procedure, HEART also has the indirect effect of providing a range of suggestions as to how the reliability may therefore be improved (from an ergonomic standpoint) and hence minimising risk.

== Background ==
HEART was developed by Williams in 1986. It is a first generation HRA technique, yet it is dissimilar to many of its contemporaries in that it remains to be widely used throughout the UK. The method essentially takes into consideration all factors which may negatively affect performance of a task in which human reliability is considered to be dependent, and each of these factors is then independently quantified to obtain an overall Human Error Probability (HEP), the collective product of the factors.

== HEART methodology ==
1. The first stage of the process is to identify the full range of sub-tasks that a system operator would be required to complete within a given task.

2. Once this task description has been constructed a nominal human unreliability score for the particular task is then determined, usually by consulting local experts. Based around this calculated point, a 5th – 95th percentile confidence range is established.

3. The EPCs, which are apparent in the given situation and highly probable to have a negative effect on the outcome, are then considered and the extent to which each EPC applies to the task in question is discussed and agreed, again with local experts. As an EPC should never be considered beneficial to a task, it is calculated using the following formula:

Calculated Effect = ((Max Effect – 1) × Proportion of Effect) + 1

4. A final estimate of the HEP is then calculated, in determination of which the identified EPC's play a large part.

Only those EPC's which show much evidence with regards to their affect in the contextual situation should be used by the assessor.

== Worked example ==
=== Context ===
A reliability engineer has the task of assessing the probability of a plant operator failing to carry out the task of isolating a plant bypass route as required by procedure. However, the operator is fairly inexperienced in fulfilling this task and therefore typically does not follow the correct procedure; the individual is therefore unaware of the hazards created when the task is carried out

=== Assumptions ===
There are various assumptions that should be considered in the context of the situation:

- the operator is working a shift in which he is in his 7th hour.
- there is talk circulating the plant that it is due to close down
- it is possible for the operator's work to be checked at any time
- local management aim to keep the plant open despite a desperate need for re-vamping and maintenance work; if the plant is closed down for a short period, if the problems are unattended, there is a risk that it may remain closed permanently.

=== Method ===
A representation of this situation using the HEART methodology would be done as follows:

From the relevant tables it can be established that the type of task in this situation is of the type (F) which is defined as 'Restore or shift a system to original or new state following procedures, with some checking'. This task type has the proposed nominal human unreliability value of 0.003.

Other factors to be included in the calculation are provided in the table below:

Factor	Total HEART Effect	Assessed Proportion of Effect	Assessed Effect
Inexperience	x3	0.4	(3.0-1) x 0.4 + 1 =1.8
Opposite technique	x6	1.0	(6.0-1) x 1.0 + 1 =6.0
Risk Misperception	x4	0.8	(4.0-1) x 0.8 + 1 =3.4
Conflict of Objectives	x2.5	0.8	(2.5-1) x 0.8 + 1 =2.2
Low Morale	x1.2	0.6	(1.2-1) x 0.6 + 1 =1.12

=== Result ===
The final calculation for the normal likelihood of failure can therefore be formulated as:

0.003 x 1.8 x 6.0 x 3.4 x 2.2 x 1.12 = 0.27

== Advantages ==
- HEART is very quick and straightforward to use and also has a small demand for resource usage
- The technique provides the user with useful suggestions as to how to reduce the occurrence of errors
- It provides ready linkage between Ergonomics and Process Design, with reliability improvement measures being a direct conclusion which can be drawn from the assessment procedure.
- It allows cost benefit analyses to be conducted
- It is highly flexible and applicable in a wide range of areas which contributes to the popularity of its use

== Disadvantages ==
- The main criticism of the HEART technique is that the EPC data has never been fully released and it is therefore not possible to fully review the validity of Williams EPC data base. Kirwan has done some empirical validation on HEART and found that it had "a reasonable level of accuracy" but was not necessarily better or worse than the other techniques in the study. Further theoretical validation is thus required.
- HEART relies to a high extent on expert opinion, first in the point probabilities of human error, and also in the assessed proportion of EPC effect. The final HEPs are therefore sensitive to both optimistic and pessimistic assessors
- The interdependence of EPCs is not modelled in this methodology, with the HEPs being multiplied directly. This assumption of independence does not necessarily hold in a real situation.

== See also ==
- The curse of expertise
- Threat and error management
- Expert witnesses in English law
- Winner's curse
- Sports Illustrated cover jinx
