= Modular redundancy =

Modular redundancy may refer to:

- Dual modular redundancy, in reliability engineering where system components are duplicated
- Triple modular redundancy, in reliability engineering where system components are triplicated
