= List of system quality attributes =

Non-functional requirements for system evaluation

Within systems engineering, quality attributes are realized non-functional requirements used to evaluate the performance of a system. These are sometimes named architecture characteristics, or "ilities" after the suffix many of the words share. They are usually architecturally significant requirements that require architects' attention.

In software architecture, these attributes are known as "architectural characteristic" or non-functional requirements. Note that it's software architects' responsibility to match these attributes with business requirements and user requirements. Note that synchronous communication between software architectural components, entangles them and they must share the same architectural characteristics.

== Quality attributes ==
Notable quality attributes include:

- accessibility
- accountability
- accuracy
- adaptability
- administrability
- affordability
- agility (see Common subsets below)
- analyzability
- auditability
- autonomy
- availability
- compatibility
- composability
- confidentiality
- configurability
- convenience
- correctness
- credibility
- customizability
- debuggability
- degradability
- determinability
- demonstrability
- dependability (see Common subsets below)
- deployability
- discoverability
- distributability
- durability
- effectiveness
- efficiency
- elasticity
- evolvability
- extensibility
- failure transparency
- familiarity
- fault-tolerance
- fidelity
- flexibility
- inspectability
- installability
- integrity
- interactivity
- interchangeability
- interoperability
- intuitiveness
- learnability
- localizability
- maintainability
- manageability
- mobility
- modifiability
- modularity
- observability
- operability
- orthogonality
- portability
- precision
- predictability
- process capabilities
- proactivity
- producibility
- provability
- recoverability
- redundancy
- relevance
- reliability
- repairability
- repeatability
- reproducibility
- resilience
- responsiveness
- reusability
- robustness
- safety
- scalability
- seamlessness
- self-sustainability
- serviceability (a.k.a. supportability)
- securability (see Common subsets below)
- simplicity
- stability
- standards compliance
- survivability
- sustainability
- tailorability
- testability
- timeliness
- traceability
- transparency
- ubiquity
- understandability
- upgradability
- usability
- vulnerability

Many of these quality attributes can also be applied to data quality.

== Common subsets ==
- Together, reliability, availability, serviceability, usability and installability, are referred to as RASUI.
- Functionality, usability, reliability, performance and supportability are together referred to as FURPS in relation to software requirements.
- Agility in working software is an aggregation of seven architecturally sensitive attributes: debuggability, extensibility, portability, scalability, securability, testability and understandability.
- For databases reliability, availability, scalability and recoverability (RASR), is an important concept.
- Atomicity, consistency, isolation (sometimes integrity), durability (ACID) is a transaction metric.
- When dealing with safety-critical systems, the acronym reliability, availability, maintainability and safety (RAMS) is frequently used.
- Dependability is an aggregate of availability, reliability, safety, integrity and maintainability.
  - Integrity depends on security and survivability.
  - Security is a composite of confidentiality, integrity and availability. Security and dependability are often treated together.

== See also ==
- Non-functional requirement
- Information quality
- ISO/IEC 9126 Software engineering—product quality
- Cognitive dimensions of notations
- Software quality
