= Anti-genre =

Anti-genre is a self-descriptive label attributed to any artistic style devoid of genre. This lack of genre-status can either be the result of:
(1) an active attempt to evade categorization (transcend all genres),
(2) conscious negation of the ethos of its medium (unlearning of history),
(3) an active and conscious negation of itself.

The anti-genre is not simply an assault on tradition (previous artistic styles), for every anti-thesis in history would then fall under this title. (see Hard versus Soft section) The anti-genre, rather implies a more direct and nihilistic attack on the foundations of its medium. The anti-genre is in a perpetual state of evasion both from external taxonomy, but also from itself.

The artistic movement known as Dada is likely the best example of the anti-genre, although the Dada manifestos of Hugo Ball and Tristan Tzara never use the term 'anti-genre' to describe Dada,

DADA DOES NOT MEAN ANYTHING. Every man must shout: there is great destructive, negative work to be done. To sweep, to clean. Dada means nothing... Thought is produced in the mouth.

The etymology of the term anti-genre borrows its semantic form from the terms anti- meaning against and genre, (French "kind," related to the English "gender")

== Examples in Music ==
The best example of the anti-genre in music is John Cage's 1952 composition 4′33″, in which the entire performance consists of four and a half minutes of utter silence. The musicians are instructed not to play their instruments. All the audience can hear is the sound of themselves.

In this famous and controversial piece, John Cage presents silence as the antithesis of music. Thus, the absence of all audible content becomes music's anti-genre. There are, however other examples.

If music is the artistic arrangement of sound, then the non-artistic arrangement of sound might be a suitable candidate for musical-negation. Non-music becomes noise, rather than artful melody and rhythm. Examples of noise music range from guitar-based feedback recordings and live performances (The Melvins, Nine Inch Nails, Jimi Hendrix) to the screeching sounds of Screamo, Grindcore, industrial music or contemporary dance electronic styles like Gabber, Terrorcore, Breakcore, Glitch, etc. Indeed, the entire ethos of the Punk subculture was based on nihilism, which by its very nature seeks category annihilation.

== Examples in Literature ==
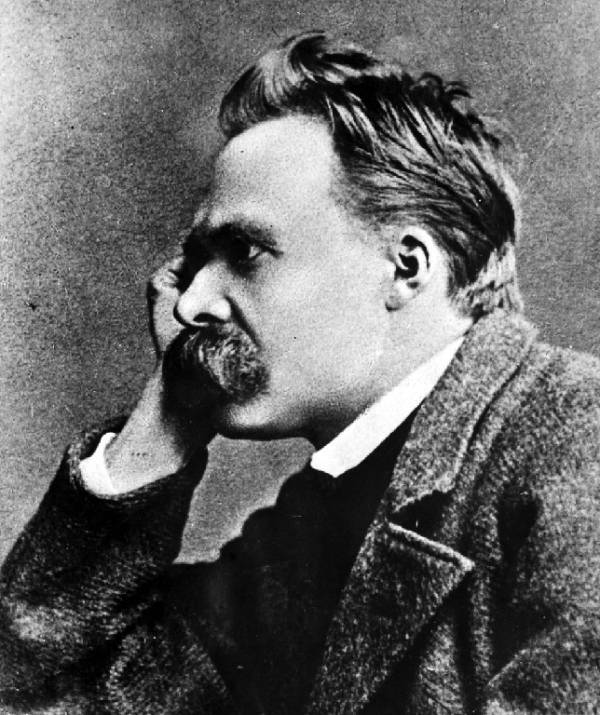
Friedrich Wilhelm Nietzsche.

The anti-genre, in literature, comes into being in particular during the mid to late 19th century. Both Fyodor Dostoyevsky's 1864 novel Notes from Underground, with his introduction of the anti-hero (referred to as the Underground Man) as well as Friedrich Nietzsche's The Antichrist published in 1895, represent early works in the tradition.

For Dostoyevsky's underground man, all the virtues of the traditional protagonist (the hero) are turned upside down. Rather than courageous he is weak and complains of both physical pain as well as deeper (more existential) angst. Rather than altruism and chivalry he feels vengeance and spite towards others. Dostoyevsky's underground man introduces to western literature the archetype of the anti-hero. His early work also attacks the positivists of the Enlightenment era, thereby strengthening the case against utopian optimism. The introduction of the anti-hero combined with his dystopian proposal, represent more of a soft anti-genre status rather than the more technical definition of the term.

For Nietzsche, the task of overcoming history required a grand declaration of war. His enemies were many: In the last sane year of his life he was able to complete two final texts, Twilight of the Idols and The Anti-Christ.

More technical examples of the anti-genre in literature might include meta-fiction or aleatoricism, but there is lack of contemporary scholarship on the topic to resolve this matter definitively.

== Examples in Computer Science ==
The most technical description of the paradox of the anti-genre can be found in computer science. In computer programming an infinite loop is often an un-intended result (bug) of circular self-reference in the program code.

For example, the Dada artist's eternal maxim declares,

Dada had only one rule: Never follow any rules.

If we (hypothetically) run this maxim through a recursive computer algorithm, it would cause program error. For, if Dada does not obey this rule then Dada would be free to follow any rules (a direct refutation of this maxim), but if it obeys this maxim then there is at least one rule which it is following (a contradiction). In the language of computer programming this is fatal (it prevents an exit condition from being met) but for the artist this might be the ultimate goal of his/her art.

== Hard versus Soft ==
The technical definition of anti-genre (hard version) is not merely art that insults its predecessors. The hard version is more active in its flight from meaning. It is self-consciously involved in the process of not just breaking with tradition but undoing the entire framework that distinguishes the different genre categories in that medium. Silence in place of music and the blank canvas in place of paint, are two obvious examples of this.

The soft version however, is a little harder to nail down. The definition of a soft anti-genre might include art intentionally dispensing with conventions of its medium or violently breaking with tradition by subversion, vandalism-art, irrationality, self-defeat or other strategies in a rebellious spirit.

The problem with this lighter version of anti-genre is that all artistic movements by definition represent a decisive break with the traditions that came before them. If not, then they would merely be continuous with their predecessors. This is known as the process of dialectic. First, a thesis is proposed. Then the thesis is rejected by the anti-thesis. This rejection is eventually accepted by the community and a synthesis of thesis and anti-thesis come together to create the new proposal ready for rejection. And so the cycle continues.

It is important to emphasize the hard and soft distinction however because there is a tendency in postmodernity to associate negative/rebellious attitudes in artistic movements with formal categories like anti-genre, despite the fact that the anti-genre, in its hard version, has a much more technical definition.

== See also ==
- Aleatoricism
- Anti-art
- Anti-anti-art
- Anti-hero
- Antithesis
- Art intervention
- Autological word
- Conceptual art
- Dadaism
- Dystopian
- Gödel, Escher, Bach
- Graceful exit / No Exit
- Infinite Loop
- Metafiction
- Mise en abyme
- Nihilism
- Recursion
- Software bug
- Sound art
- Thesis, antithesis, synthesis
