= Sheldon E. Isakoff =

American chemical engineer

- Citizenship: United States
- Education: Columbia University
- Known for: unsteady-rate operations control
- Awards: National Academy of Engineering
- Scientific career
- Fields: chemical engineering
- Workplaces: DuPont

Sheldon E. Isakoff is a chemical engineer, former director of Engineering Research and Development at DuPont, and former committee member of the National Research Council. His major contributions include the development of EFT Dacron and nylon processes, improvements to Mylar and Cronar process, and the establishment of the first Lycra plant in the world. He is also honored for his contributions in unsteady-rate operations control. After retirement from industry, Isakoff served as the president of United Engineering Trustees and chairman of the Chemical Heritage Foundation board.

== Background and work ==
Between 1945 and 1952, Isakoff received a B.S., M.S., and Ph.D from Columbia University's School of Engineering and Applied Science. After graduating from Columbia, he joined DuPont Company. There he pioneered works in process dynamics and computer applications as research director of the materials engineering laboratory and of the engineering physics laboratory. His other research directions encompassed technology management, market assessment, process scale-up, and commercialization. Isakoff later returned to Columbia as an advisor in the Chemical Engineering Department.

== Recognition ==
Sheldon Isakoff is a member of the National Academy of Engineering. He was president of the American Institute of Chemical Engineers and a fellow of the American Association for the Advancement of Science. He was recipient of Columbia University's Pupin Medal and Egleston Medal of excellence. He is the author of numerous chemical engineering books including High-Tech Materials: Challenges and Opportunities for Chemical Engineers.
