= Graceful exit =

Simple programming idiom in a program to detect and manage a serious error condition

A graceful exit (or graceful handling) is a simple programming idiom wherein a program detects a serious error condition and "exits gracefully" in a controlled manner as a result. Often the program prints a descriptive error message to a terminal or log as part of the graceful exit.

Usually, code for a graceful exit exists when the alternative — allowing the error to go undetected and unhandled — would produce spurious errors or later anomalous behavior that would be more difficult for the programmer to debug. The code associated with a graceful exit may also take additional steps, such as closing files, to ensure that the program leaves data in a consistent, recoverable state.

Graceful exits are not always desired. In many cases, an outright crash can give the software developer the opportunity to attach a debugger or collect important information, such as a core dump or stack trace, to diagnose the root cause of the error.

In a language that supports formal exception handling, a graceful exit may be the final step in the handling of an exception. In other languages graceful exits can be implemented with additional statements at the locations of possible errors.

The phrase "graceful exit" has also been generalized to refer to letting go from a job or relationship in life that has ended.

== In programming languages ==
=== Perl ===
In the Perl programming language, graceful exits are generally implemented via the die operator. For example, the code for opening a file often reads like the following:

# Open the file 'myresults' for writing, or die with an appropriate error message.
open RESULTS, '>', 'myresults' or die "can't write to 'myresults' file: $!";

If the attempt to open the file myresults fails, the containing program will terminate with an error message and an exit status indicating abnormal termination.

=== Java ===
In the Java programming language, the try/catch block is used often to catch exceptions. All potentially dangerous code is placed inside the block and, if an exception occurred, is stopped, or caught.

import java.io.File;
import java.io.IOException;
import java.util.Scanner;

try {
    // Try to read the file "file.txt"
    Scanner sc = new Scanner(new File("file.txt"));
    while (sc.hasNextLine()) {
        System.out.println(sc.readLine());
    }
    sc.close();
} catch (IOException e) {
    // The file could not be read
    System.err.println("The file could not be read. Stack trace:");
    e.printStackTrace();
}

=== C ===
In C one can use the error() function, provided in GNU by the GNU C Library.

#include <errno.h>
#include <error.h>
#include <fcntl.h>

if (open("/dev/urandom", O_RDONLY) < 0) {
    error(1, errno, "Open failed");
}

If the first parameter is non-zero, this function will exit from the parent process and return that parameter.

=== Python ===
In Python, graceful exits can be created using the built-in try/except block similar to the try/catch block in Java.

import json
from json import JSONDecodeError

if __name__ == "__main__":
    try:
        with open("data.json", mode="r", encoding="utf-8") as f:
            data = json.load(f)
        print(data)
    except FileNotFoundError:
        print("Error: File not found.")
    except PermissionError:
        print("Error: Program is lacking sufficient permissions.")
    except JSONDecodeError:
        print("Error: Json file contains errors.")
    except Exception as e:
        print(f"A general error has occurred: {e}")

The use of multiple except cases allows different handling of various errors. However, one may benefit from printing certain errors to debug using the stack trace(e.g. in the case of a JSON decode error). In the last except statement, the error is caught and saved into the variable e which can be used to obtain information about the error.

== See also ==
- Graceful degradation
- Fail-safe
