= Equipment of Strategic Air Command =

List of military equipment

Strategic Air Command equipment includes weapon systems and ordnance (e.g., strategic weapons such as ICBMs), ground radars and computers (e.g., at SSN 1979-82), and other Cold War devices of the USAF major command.

== Special Weapons Emergency Separation System ==
This system (SWESS), also known informally as the dead man's switch, was a nuclear bomb release system that the United States Air Force Strategic Air Command built into bombers such as the B-52 Stratofortress. The system's purpose was to ensure that an aircraft's payload of nuclear weapons would detonate in the event of the crew becoming debilitated by enemy defences such as missiles. Once armed, the system would ensure that the onboard nuclear weapons detonated if the aircraft dropped below a predetermined altitude.

== SAC Equipment ==
SAC Equipment
Type	Model	Start	End
Combat aircraft	B-1 Lancer	1986	1992
Combat aircraft	B-17 Flying Fortress (RB-17G)	1946	1951
Combat aircraft	A-26 Invader (RB-26)	1949	1950
Combat aircraft	B-29 Superfortress	1946	1953
Combat aircraft	B-36 Peacemaker	1948	1958
Combat aircraft	B-45 Tornado	1950	1953
Combat aircraft	B-47 Stratojet	1951	1965
Combat aircraft	B-50 Superfortress	1948	1954
Combat aircraft	B-52 Stratofortress	1955	1992
Combat aircraft	B-57 Canberra	1956	1962
Combat aircraft	B-58 Hustler	1960	1969
Combat aircraft	C-119 Flying Boxcar	1956	1973
Combat aircraft	DC-130 Hercules	1966	1976
Combat aircraft	EC-135 Looking Glass	1963	1992
Combat aircraft	F-2 Expeditor (F=Fotorecon; C-45)		
Combat aircraft	F-6 Mustang (F=Fotorecon; P-51)		
Combat aircraft	F-9 Flying Fortress (F=Fotorecon; B-17F/G)		
Combat aircraft	F-13 Superfortress (F=Fotorecon; B-29A)		
Combat aircraft	F-47 Thunderbolt (P-47)	1946	1947
Combat aircraft	F-51 Mustang (P-51)	1946	1949
Combat aircraft	F-82 Twin Mustang	1947	1950
Combat aircraft	F-80 Shooting Star	1946	1948
Combat aircraft	F-84 Thunderjet	1948	1957
Combat aircraft	F-86 Sabre	1949	1950
Combat aircraft	F-102 Delta Dagger	1960	1976
Combat aircraft	FB-111 Aardvark	1969	1990
Combat aircraft	KC-10 Extender	1981	1992
Combat aircraft	KB-29	1949	1956
Combat aircraft	KC-97 Stratofreighter SAC	1951	1964
Combat aircraft	KC-135 Stratotanker SAC	1957	1991
Combat aircraft	RC-45 Expeditor		
Combat aircraft	RC-135	1961	1991
Combat aircraft	SR-71 Blackbird	1966	1991
Combat aircraft	U-2 Dragon Lady	1962	1991
Combat aircraft	TR-1 Dragon Lady	1989	1991
Support aircraft	UC-45 Expeditor		
Support aircraft	AT-11 Kansan		
Support aircraft	B-26 Invader	1949	1950
Support aircraft	C-45 Expeditor	1946	1951
Support aircraft	C-47 Skytrain	1946	1947
Support aircraft	C-54 Skymaster	1946	1975
Support aircraft	C-82 Packet	1946	1947
Support aircraft	C-97 Stratofreighter	1949	1978
Support aircraft	C-118 Liftmaster	1957	1975
Support aircraft	C-124 Globemaster II	1959	1962
Support aircraft	C-131 Samaritan		
Support aircraft	C-135 Stratolifter		
Support aircraft	CH-3 Sea King SAC c. 1960s		
Support aircraft	HU-16 Albatross SAC c. 1950s/1960s		
Support aircraft	L-4 Grasshopper	1949	1950
Support aircraft	L-5 Sentinel	1949	1950
Support aircraft	L-13 Grasshopper	1949	1950
Support aircraft	PBY Catalina		
Support aircraft	T-38 Talon	1981	1991
Support aircraft	UH-1 Iroquois	1966	1992
Missile	ADM-20 Quail		
Missile	AGM-28 Hound Dog		
Missile	AGM-69 SRAM		
Missile	AGM-84 Harpoon		
Missile	AGM-86 Air Launched Cruise Missile		
Missile	AGM-129 Advanced Cruise Missile		
Missile	HGM-16 Atlas		
Missile	HGM-25A Titan I		
Missile	LGM-25 Titan II		
Missile	LGM-30A/B Minuteman I		
Missile	LGM-30F Minuteman II		
Missile	LGM-30G Minuteman III		
Missile	LGM-118A Peacekeeper		
Missile	SM-62 Snark		
Missile	PGM-17A Thor		
Missile	PGM-19A Jupiter		
Ground system	Athena computer		
Ground system	AN/MPS-9		
Ground system	AN/MSQ-1		
Ground system	AN/MSQ-2		
Ground system	AN/MSQ-35		
Ground system	AN/MSQ-77	1965	
Ground system	AN/MSQ-81		
Ground system	AN/MSQ-96		
Ground system	AN/TLQ-11		
Ground system	BMEWS	1979	1982
Ground system	GWEN		
Ground system	train: Big Star (ICBM)		
Ground system	trains: RBS Express (3)	1961	c. 1971
Ground system	SACCCS		

== See also ==
- Permissive Action Link
- Fail-deadly
