= Segal's law =

Adage about conflicting sources of information

Segal's law is an adage that states:

A man with a watch knows what time it is. A man with two watches is never sure.

At surface level, the adage emphasizes the consistency that arises when information comes from a single source and points out the potential pitfalls of having too much conflicting information. However, the underlying message is to question the apparent certainty of anyone who only has one source of information. The man with one watch has no way to identify error or uncertainty.

== History ==
The saying was coined by the San Diego Union newspaper on September 20, 1930: "Confusion.—Retail jewelers assert that every man should carry two watches. But a man with one watch knows what time it is, and a man with two watches could never be sure." Later this was mistakenly attributed to Lee Segall of the radio station KIXL, then to be misquoted again by Arthur Bloch as "Segal's Law".

== See also ==
- List of chronometers on HMS Beagle
- Church of St Anne (Shandon) § Clock, known as "the four-faced liar"
- Triple modular redundancy § Chronometers
