= Survivability =

Ability to remain alive or continue to exist

Survivability is the ability to remain alive or continue to exist. The term has more specific meaning in certain contexts.

== Ecological ==
Following disruptive disturbances such as floods, wildfires, diseases, scorched earth, or climate change, adaptable species of flora, fauna, and local life forms are likely to survive more successfully than others due to consequent changes to their surrounding biophysical conditions.

== Engineering ==
In engineering, survivability is the quantified ability of a system, subsystem, equipment, process, or procedure to continue to function during and after a natural or man-made disturbance; for example, a nuclear electromagnetic pulse from the detonation of a nuclear weapon.

For a given application, survivability must be qualified by specifying the range of conditions over which the entity will survive, the minimum acceptable level or post-disturbance functionality, and the maximum acceptable downtime.

== Military ==
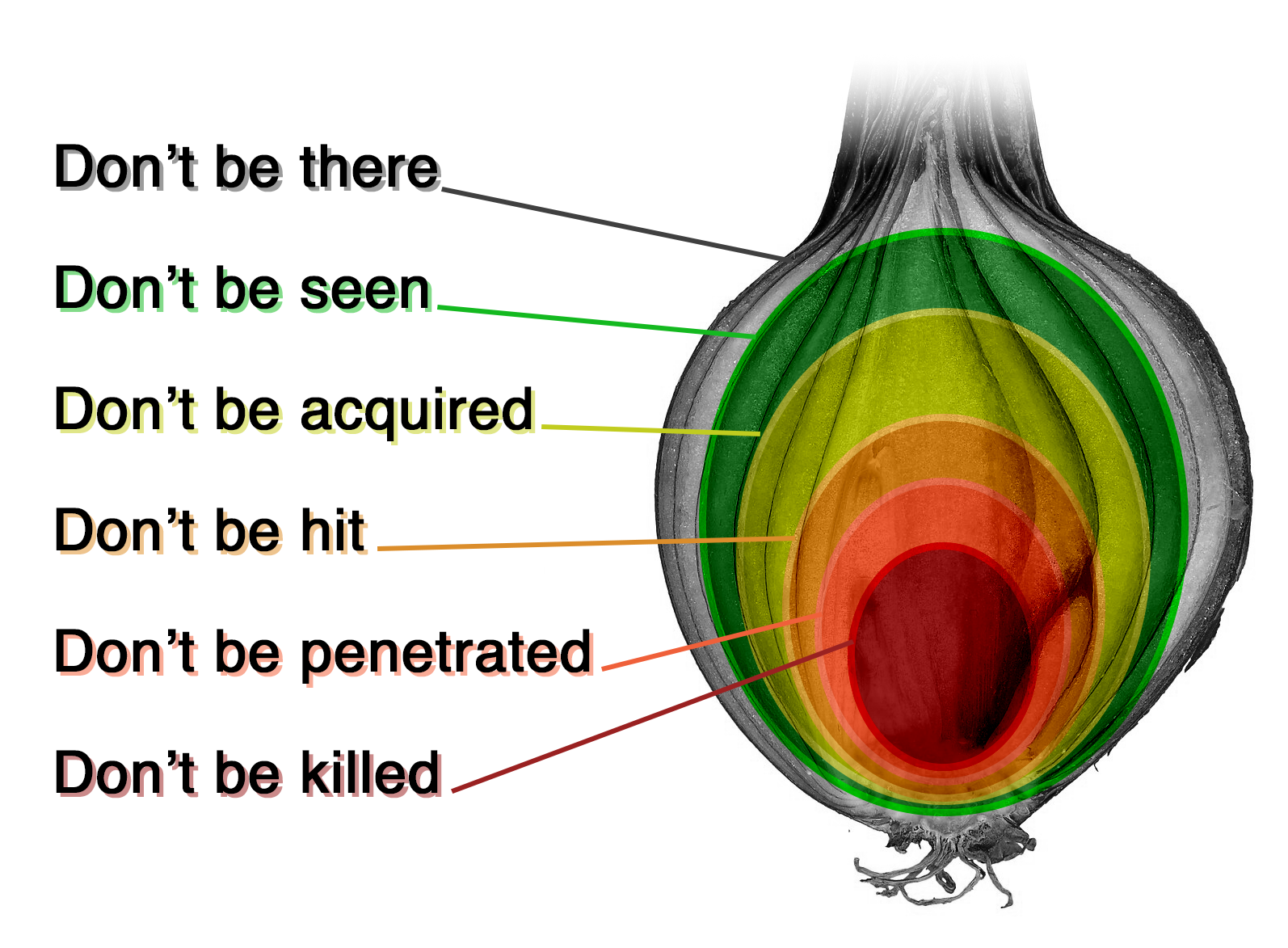
Illustration representing a survivability onion with six layers.

In the military environment, survivability can be defined as the ability to remain mission capable after a single engagement. Engineers working in survivability are often responsible for improving four main system elements:

- Detectability - the inability to avoid being aurally and visually detected as well as detected by radar (by an observer).
- Susceptibility - the inability to avoid being hit (by a weapon).
- Vulnerability - the inability to withstand the hit.
- Recoverability - longer-term post-hit effects, damage control, and firefighting, capability restoration, or (in extremis) escape and evacuation.

The European Survivability Workshop introduced the concept of "Mission Survivability" whilst retaining the three core areas above, either pertaining to the "survivability" of a platform through a complete mission, or the "survivability" of the mission itself (i.e. probability of mission success). Recent studies have also introduced the concept of "Force Survivability" which relates to the ability of a force rather than an individual platform to remain "mission capable".

There is no clear prioritisation of the three elements; this will depend on the characteristics and role of the platform. Some platform types, such as submarines and airplanes, minimise their susceptibility and may, to some extent, compromise in the other areas. Main Battle Tanks minimise vulnerability through the use of heavy armours. Present day surface warship designs tend to aim for a balanced combination of all three areas.

A popular term is the "survivability onion"; described as 5-8 layers:

Don't be there. If you are there, don’t be seen. If you are seen, don’t be targeted/acquired. If you are targeted/acquired, don’t be hit. If you are hit, don’t be penetrated. If you are penetrated, don’t be killed.

=== Naval ===
Survivability denotes the ability of a ship and its on-board systems to remain functional and continue designated mission in a man-made hostile environment. The naval vessels are designed to operate in a man-made hostile environment, and therefore the survivability is a vital feature required from them. The naval vessel's survivability is a complicated subject affecting the whole life cycle of the vessel, and should be considered from the initial design phase of every war ship.

The classical definition of naval survivability includes three main aspects, which are susceptibility, vulnerability, and recoverability; although, recoverability is often subsumed within vulnerability. Susceptibility consists of all the factors that expose the ship to the weapons effects in a combat environment. These factors in general are the operating conditions, the threat, and the features of the ship itself. The operating conditions, such as sea state, weather and atmospheric conditions, vary considerably, and their influence is difficult to address (hence they are often not accounted for in survivability assessment). The threat is dependent on the weapons directed against the ship and weapon's performance, such as the range. The features of the ship in this sense include platform signatures (radar, infrared, acoustic, magnetic), the defensive systems on board, such as surface-to-air missiles, EW and decoys, and also the tactics employed by the platform in countering the attack (aspects such as speed, maneuverability, chosen aspect presented to the threat). Vulnerability refers to the ability of the vessel to withstand the short-term effects of the threat weapon. Vulnerability is an attribute typical to the vessel and therefore heavily affected by the vessel's basic characteristics such as size, subdivision, armouring, and other hardening features, and also the design of the ship's systems, in particular the location of equipment, degrees of redundancy and separation, and the presence within a system of single point failures. Recoverability refers to vessel's ability to restore and maintain its functionality after sustaining damage. Thus, recoverability is dependent on the actions aimed to neutralize the effects of the damage. These actions include firefighting, limiting the extent of flooding, and dewatering. Besides the equipment, the crew also has a vital role in recoverability.

=== Combat vehicle crew ===
The crews of military combat vehicles face numerous lethal hazards which are both diverse and constantly evolving. Improvised Explosive Devices (IEDs), mines, and enemy fire are examples of such persistent and variable threats. Historically, measures taken to mitigate these hazards were concerned with protecting the vehicle itself, but due to this achieving only limited protection, the focus has now shifted to safeguarding the crew within from an ever-broadening range of threats, including Radio Controlled IEDs (RCIEDs), blast, fragmentation, heat stress, and dehydration.

The expressed goal of "crew survivability" is to ensure vehicle occupants are best protected. It goes beyond simply ensuring crew have the appropriate protective equipment and has expanded to include measuring the overpressure and blunt impact forces experienced by a vehicle from real blast incidents in order to develop medical treatment and improve overall crew survivability. Sustainable crew survivability is dependent on the effective integration of knowledge, training, and equipment.

==== Prevention and training ====
Threat intelligence identifying trends, emerging technologies, and attack tactics used by enemy forces enables crews to implement procedures that will reduce their exposure to unnecessary risks. Such intelligence also allows for more effective pre-deployment training programs where personnel can be taught the most up-to-date developments in IED concealment, for example, or undertake tailored training that will enable them to identify the likely attack strategy of enemy forces. In addition, with expert, current threat intelligence, the most effective equipment can be procured or rapidly developed in support of operations.

== Network ==
=== Definitions of network survivability ===
"The capability of a system to fulfill its mission, in a timely manner, in the presence of threats such as attacks or large-scale natural disasters. Survivability is a subset of resilience."

“The capability of a system to fulfill its mission, in a timely manner, in the presence of attacks, failures, or accidents.”

== See also ==
- Availability
- List of system quality attributes
