= Fail-deadly =

Concept in nuclear military strategy

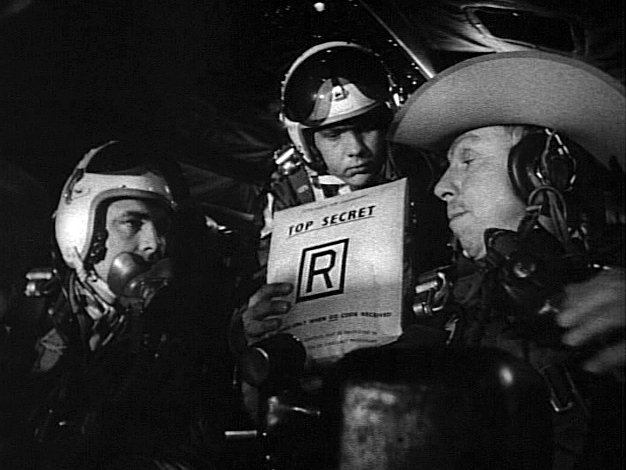
Capt. "Ace" Owens (Shane Rimmer), Lt. Dietrich (Frank Berry), and Major T. J. "King" Kong (Slim Pickens) about to open Wing Attack Plan R in Stanley Kubrick's 1964 film, Dr. Strangelove.

Fail-deadly is a concept in nuclear military strategy that encourages deterrence by guaranteeing an immediate, automatic, and overwhelming response to an attack, even if there is no one left to trigger such retaliation. The term fail-deadly was coined as a contrast to fail-safe.

Fail-deadly can refer to specific technology components, or the controls system as a whole. The United Kingdom's fail-deadly policies delegate strike authority to submarine commanders in the event of a loss of command (using letters of last resort), ensuring that even when uncoordinated, nuclear retaliation can be carried out.

== See also ==
- AN/DRC-8 Emergency Rocket Communications System
- Dead man's switch – Device that reacts to the loss of the operator
- Doomsday device – Construct which could destroy all life on a planet or a planet itself
- Dr. Strangelove
- Failing badly – Fails with a catastrophic result or without warning
- Launch on warning – Nuclear strategy
- Mutual assured destruction (MAD)
- Samson Option – Israel's deterrence strategy of massive retaliation with nuclear weapons
- Special Weapons Emergency Separation System – List of military equipment
- Two Generals' Problem
- Dead Hand
