= Dual modular redundancy =

In reliability engineering, dual modular redundancy (DMR) is when components of a system are duplicated, providing redundancy in case one should fail. It is particularly applied to systems where the duplicated components work in parallel, particularly in fault-tolerant computer systems. A typical example is a complex computer system which has duplicated nodes, so that should one node fail, another is ready to carry on its work.

DMR provides robustness to the failure of one component, and error detection in case instruments or computers that should give the same result give different results, but does not provide error correction, as which component is correct and which is malfunctioning cannot be automatically determined. There is an old adage to this effect, stating: "Never go to sea with two chronometers; take one or three." Meaning, if two chronometers contradict, a sailor may not know which one is reading correctly.

A lockstep fault-tolerant machine uses replicated elements operating in parallel. At any time, all the replications of each element should be in the same state. The same inputs are provided to each replication, and the same outputs are expected. The outputs of the replications are compared using a voting circuit. A machine with two replications of each element is termed dual modular redundant (DMR). The voting circuit can then only detect a mismatch and recovery relies on other methods. Examples include 1ESS switch.

A machine with three replications of each element is termed triple modular redundant (TMR). The voting circuit can determine which replication is in error when a two-to-one vote is observed. In this case, the voting circuit can output the correct result, and discard the erroneous version. After this, the internal state of the erroneous replication is assumed to be different from that of the other two, and the voting circuit can switch to a DMR mode. This model can be applied to any larger number of replications.

== See also ==
- Hot spare
