= Timing failure =

Process failure in machinery or computing

Timing failure is a failure in a time related process in machinery or computing. This can be where timing failures refer to "a situation where the environment in which a system operates does not behave as expected regarding the timing assumptions, that is, the timing constraints are not met."

== Computing ==
In computing, it refers to a timing failure or error in process, or part of a process, in a synchronous distributed system or real-time system to meet limits set on execution time, message delivery, clock drift rate, or clock skew. Asynchronous distributed systems cannot be said to have timing failures as guarantees are not provided for response times.

== Machinery ==
In engineering and mechanics a timing failure typically refers to an issue with the timing belt of an engine.
