= Elegant degradation =

Maintaining complete functionality through permanent damage

Elegant degradation is a term used in engineering to describe what occurs to machines which are subject to constant, repetitive stress.

Externally, such a machine maintains the same appearance to the user, appearing to function properly. Internally, the machine slowly weakens over time. Unable to withstand the stress, it eventually breaks down. Compared to graceful degradation, the operational quality does not decrease at all, but the breakdown may be just as sudden.

This term's meaning varies depending on context and field, and may not be strictly considered exclusive to engineering. For instance, this is used as a mechanism in the food industry as applied in the degradation of lignin, cellulose, pentosan, and polymers, among others. The concept is also used to extract chemicals such as the elegant degradation of Paederus fuscipes to obtain pederin and hemiacetal pseuodopederin. In this process degradation is induced by heat. A play with the same name also used it as a metaphor for the current state of the world.

== See also ==
- Fail safe
- Fail soft
