= Control operation =

In telecommunications, a control operation (control function) is an operation that affects the recording, processing, transmission, or interpretation of data.

Examples of control operations include a font change, or a rewind; and transmitting an end-of-transmission (EOT) control character.
