= Motul (company) =

French lubricant manufacturer

Motul S.A.
- Type: Limited company
- Industry: Oil refining, Lubrication, Chemistry
- Founded: 1853; 173 years ago
- Headquarters: Aubervilliers, France
- Area served: Worldwide
- Key people: Olivier Montage (CEO)
- Products: Motor oils, coolants, metalworking fluids
- Website: www.motul.com

Motul S.A. is a global French company which manufactures, develops and distributes lubricants and other specialized products for engines (motorcycles, cars and other vehicles) and for industry.

== History ==
Founded in 1853 in New York, the Swan & Finch company started its activity in the sector of high quality lubricants. As of 1920, it turned to the international markets by exporting some of its portfolio brands like Aerul, Textul, Motul.

In 1932, Ernst Zaug negotiated the distribution in France of products of the Motul brand with Swan & Finch via his company Supra Penn. In 1953, the Swan & Finch centenary was celebrated with the worldwide launch of Motul Century, which became the first multigrade oil on the European market. However, Swan & Finch suspended its activities in 1957. Supra Penn bought back all title deeds and patents pertaining to the Motul brand, which was renamed for the company's chief product, becoming Motul S.A.

== Sports competition ==
As a specialist in synthetic oils, Motul has become the partner of many manufacturers and sports teams for its technological developments in mechanical sports, car and motorcycle racing. Motul is present in many international competitions as official team supplier: MotoGP, Road racing, Trial, Enduro, Endurance, Superbike, Supercross, Rallycross, World Rally Championship, FIA GT, Le Mans 24 Hours, Spa 24 Hours, Le Mans Series, rally raid, Paris-Dakar, F3, etc. In 1977, Motul won its first Motorcycle World Champion title, in the Road Racing category, with Takazumi Katayama on a Yamaha 350.

In September 2025, Motul was announced as the official transmission lubricant supplier for the McLaren Formula 1 Team from 2026 onwards. In January 2026, the deal was expanded to the McLaren WEC Hypercar Team.

== Standards and certifications ==
- EAQF class B in 1992, EAQF class A since 1994, ISO 9001 since 1996
- QS9000 developed by Ford, General Motors and Chrysler
- ISO/TS 16949 developed by the IATF (International Automotive Task Force)
- NMMA (water sports)

== See also ==
- Lubrication
- Tribology
- Motor oil
