= Quality assurance =

Ways of ensuring the quality of a service or product

Quality assurance (QA) is the term used in both manufacturing and service industries to describe the systematic efforts taken to assure that the product(s) delivered to customer(s) meet with the contractual and other agreed upon performance, design, reliability, and maintainability expectations of that customer. The core purpose of quality assurance is to prevent mistakes and defects in the development and production of both manufactured products, such as automobiles and shoes, and delivered services, such as automotive repair and athletic shoe design. Assuring quality and therefore avoiding problems and delays when delivering products or services to customers is what ISO 9000 defines as that "part of quality management focused on providing confidence that quality requirements will be fulfilled". This defect prevention aspect of quality assurance differs from the defect detection aspect of quality control and has been referred to as a shift left since it focuses on quality efforts earlier in product development and production (i.e., a shift to the left of a linear process diagram reading left to right) and on avoiding defects in the first place rather than correcting them after the fact.

The terms "quality assurance" and "quality control" are often used interchangeably to refer to ways of ensuring the quality of a service or product. For instance, the term "assurance" is often used in a context such as: Implementation of inspection and structured testing as a measure of quality assurance in a television set software project at Philips Semiconductors is described. where inspection and structured testing are the measurement phase of a quality assurance strategy referred to as the DMAIC model (define, measure, analyze, improve, control). DMAIC is a data-driven quality strategy used to improve processes. The term "control" is the fifth phase of this strategy.

Quality assurance comprises administrative and procedural activities implemented in a quality system so that requirements and goals for a product, service or activity will be accomplished. It is the systematic measurement, comparison with a standard, and monitoring of processes in an associated feedback loop that confers error prevention. This can be contrasted with quality control, which is focused on process output.

Quality assurance includes two principles: "fit for purpose" (the product should be suitable for the intended purpose); and "right first time" (mistakes should be eliminated). QA includes management of the quality of raw materials, assemblies, products and components, services related to production, and management, production and inspection processes. The two principles also manifest before the background of developing (engineering) a novel technical product: The task of engineering is to make it work once, while the task of quality assurance is to make it work all the time.

Historically, defining what suitable product or service quality means has been a more difficult process, determined in many ways, from the subjective user-based approach that contains "the different weights that individuals normally attach to quality characteristics," to the value-based approach which finds consumers linking quality to price and making overall conclusions of quality based on such a relationship.

== History ==
=== Initial efforts to control the quality of production ===
During the Middle Ages, guilds adopted responsibility for the quality of goods and services offered by their members, setting and maintaining certain standards for guild membership.

Royal governments purchasing material were interested in quality control as customers. For this reason, King John of England appointed William de Wrotham to report about the construction and repair of ships. Centuries later, Samuel Pepys, Secretary to the British Admiralty, appointed multiple such overseers to standardize sea rations and naval training.

Prior to the extensive division of labor and mechanization resulting from the Industrial Revolution, it was possible for workers to control the quality of their own products. The Industrial Revolution led to a system in which large groups of people performing a specialized type of work were grouped together under the supervision of a foreman who was appointed to control the quality of work manufactured.

=== Wartime production ===
During the time of the First World War, manufacturing processes typically became more complex, with larger numbers of workers being supervised. This period saw the widespread introduction of mass production and piece work, which created problems as workmen could now earn more money by the production of extra products, which in turn occasionally led to poor quality workmanship being passed on to the assembly lines. Pioneers such as Frederick Winslow Taylor and Henry Ford recognized the limitations of the methods being used in mass production at the time and the subsequent varying quality of output. Taylor, utilizing the concept of scientific management, helped separate production tasks into many simple steps (the assembly line) and limited quality control to a few specific individuals, limiting complexity. Ford emphasized standardization of design and component standards to ensure a standard product was produced, while quality was the responsibility of machine inspectors, "placed in each department to cover all operations ... at frequent intervals, so that no faulty operation shall proceed for any great length of time."

Out of this also came statistical process control (SPC), which was pioneered by Walter A. Shewhart at Bell Laboratories in the early 1920s. Shewhart developed the control chart in 1924 and the concept of a state of statistical control. Statistical control is equivalent to the concept of exchangeability developed by logician William Ernest Johnson, also in 1924, in his book Logic, Part III: The Logical Foundations of Science. Along with a team at AT&T that included Harold Dodge and Harry Romig, he worked to put sampling inspection on a rational statistical basis as well. Shewhart consulted with Colonel Leslie E. Simon in the application of control charts to munitions manufacture at the Army's Picatinny Arsenal in 1934. That successful application helped convince Army Ordnance to engage AT&T's George Edwards to consult on the use of statistical quality control among its divisions and contractors at the outbreak of World War II.

=== Postwar ===
After World War II, many countries' manufacturing capabilities that had been destroyed during the war were rebuilt. General Douglas MacArthur oversaw the rebuilding of Japan. He involved two key people in the development of modern quality concepts: W. Edwards Deming and Joseph Juran. They and others promoted the collaborative concepts of quality to Japanese business and technical groups, and these groups used these concepts in the redevelopment of the Japanese economy.

Although there were many people trying to lead United States industries toward a more comprehensive approach to quality, the US continued to apply the Quality Control (QC) concepts of inspection and sampling to remove defective products from production lines, essentially unaware of or ignoring advances in QA for decades.

== Approaches ==
=== Failure testing ===
It is valuable to failure test or stress test a complete consumer product. In mechanical terms this is the operation of a product until it fails, often under stresses such as increasing vibration, temperature, and humidity. This may expose many unanticipated weaknesses in the product, and the data is used to drive engineering and manufacturing process improvements. Often quite simple changes can dramatically improve product service, such as changing to mold-resistant paint or adding lock-washer placement to the training for new assembly personnel.

=== Statistical control ===
Statistical control is based on analyses of objective and subjective data. Many organizations use statistical process control as a tool in any quality improvement effort to track quality data. Product quality data is statistically charted to distinguish between common cause variation or special cause variation.

Walter Shewart of Bell Telephone Laboratories recognized that when a product is made, data can be taken from scrutinized areas of a sample lot of the part and statistical variances are then analyzed and charted. Control can then be implemented on the part in the form of rework or scrap, or control can be implemented on the process that made the part, ideally eliminating the defect before more parts can be made like it.

=== Total quality management ===
The quality of products is dependent upon that of the participating constituents, some of which are sustainable and effectively controlled while others are not. The process(es) which are managed with QA pertain to total quality management.

If the specification does not reflect the true quality requirements, the product's quality cannot be guaranteed. For instance, the parameters for a pressure vessel should cover not only the material and dimensions but operating, environmental, safety, reliability and maintainability requirements.

=== Models and standards ===
ISO 17025 is an international standard that specifies the general requirements for the competence to carry out tests and or calibrations. There are 15 management requirements and 10 technical requirements. These requirements outline what a laboratory must do to become accredited. Management system refers to the organization's structure for managing its processes or activities that transform inputs of resources into a product or service which meets the organization's objectives, such as satisfying the customer's quality requirements, complying with regulations, or meeting environmental objectives. WHO has developed several tools and offers training courses for quality assurance in public health laboratories.

The Capability Maturity Model Integration (CMMI) model is widely used to implement process and product quality assurance (PPQA) in an organization. The CMMI maturity levels can be divided into 5 steps, which a company can achieve by performing specific activities within the organization.

=== Company quality ===
During the 1980s, the concept of "company quality" with the focus on management and people came to the fore in the U.S. It was considered that, if all departments approached quality with an open mind, success was possible if management led the quality improvement process.

The company-wide quality approach places an emphasis on four aspects (enshrined in standards such as ISO 9001):

1. Elements such as controls, job management, adequate processes, performance and integrity criteria, and identification of records
2. Competence such as knowledge, skills, experiences, qualifications
3. Soft elements, such as personnel integrity, confidence, organizational culture, motivation, team spirit and quality relationships
4. Infrastructure (as it enhances or limits functionality)

The quality of the outputs is at risk if any of these aspects is deficient.

The importance of actually measuring Quality Culture throughout the organization is illustrated by a survey that was done by Forbes Insights in partnership with the American Society for Quality. 75% of senior or C-suite titles believed that their organization exhibits "a comprehensive, group-wide culture of quality." But agreement with that response dropped to less than half among those with quality job titles. In other words, the further from the C-suite, the less favorable the view of the culture of quality. A survey of more than 60 multinational companies found that those companies whose employees rated as having a low quality culture had increased costs of $67 million/year for every 5000 employees compared to those rated as having a high quality culture.

QA is not limited to manufacturing, and can be applied to any business or non-business activity, including: design, consulting, banking, insurance, computer software development, retailing, investment, transportation, education, and translation.

It comprises a quality improvement process, which is generic in the sense that it can be applied to any of these activities and it establishes a quality culture, which supports the achievement of quality.

This in turn is supported by quality management practices which can include a number of business systems and which are usually specific to the activities of the business unit concerned.

In manufacturing and construction activities, these business practices can be equated to the models for quality assurance defined by the international standards contained in the ISO 9000 series and the specified specifications for quality systems.

In the system of company quality, the work being carried out was shop floor inspection which did not reveal the major quality problems. This led to quality assurance or total quality control, which has come into being recently.

== In practice ==
=== Medical industry ===
QA is very important in the medical field because it helps to identify the standards of medical equipment and services. Hospitals and laboratories make use of external agencies in order to ensure standards for equipment such as X-ray machines, diagnostic radiology and AERB. QA is particularly applicable throughout the development and introduction of new medicines and medical devices. The Research Quality Association (RQA) supports and promotes the quality of research in life sciences, through its members and regulatory bodies.

=== Aerospace industry ===
The term product assurance (PA) is often used instead of quality assurance and is, alongside project management and engineering, one of the three primary project functions. Quality assurance is seen as one part of product assurance. Due to the sometimes catastrophic consequences a single failure can have for human lives, the environment, a device, or a mission, product assurance plays a particularly important role here. It has organizational, budgetary and product developmental independence meaning that it reports to highest management only, has its own budget, and does not expend labor to help build a product. Product assurance stands on an equal footing with project management but embraces the customer's point of view.

=== Software development ===
Software quality assurance refers to monitoring the software engineering processes and methods used to ensure quality, as well verification and validation of the resulting output (i.e., product functionality and code). Various methods or frameworks are employed for this, such as ensuring conformance to one or more standards, e.g. ISO 25010 (which supersede ISO/IEC 9126) or process models such as CMMI, or SPICE. In addition, enterprise quality management software is used to correct issues such as supply chain disaggregation and to ensure regulatory compliance; these are vital for medical device manufacturers.

=== Using contractors or consultants ===
Consultants and contractors are sometimes employed when introducing new quality practices and methods, particularly where the relevant skills and expertise and resources are not available within the organization. Consultants and contractors will often employ quality management systems (QMS), auditing and procedural documentation writing CMMI, Six Sigma, measurement systems analysis (MSA), quality function deployment (QFD), failure mode and effects analysis (FMEA), and advanced product quality planning (APQP).

== See also ==
- Best practice
- Data integrity
- Data quality
- Durable good
- Farm assurance
- GxP
- Mission assurance
- Product testing
- Production assurance
- Program assurance
- QA/QC
- Quality engineering
- Quality management system
- Quality management
- Reliability engineering
- Ringtest
- Shift-left testing
- Software testing
- TPS report
- Verification and validation
