= ANX =

Anx or ANX may refer to:

== Arts and media ==
- Anx, List of Star Wars races (A-E), an alien race in Star Wars
- Anx (album), 2012, by the hip hop duo Dark Time Sunshine
- All Night Express uses these initials in ROH wrestling

== Other uses ==
- Anx (brachiopod), a brachiopod genus
- Anadis, a small biotech company
- Andøya Airport, Andenes, from its IATA airport code
- Annex, abbreviated "Anx", a street suffix used in the US
- Automotive Network Exchange
