= ITF =

ITF may refer to:

- Indian Territorial Force, part of the Indian Army during British India
- Industry Technology Facilitator, oil industry organization
- Integrated test facility, for testing a production system with dummy data
- Interleaved 2 of 5, bar code format
- International Holocaust Remembrance Alliance, also known as Task Force for International Cooperation on Holocaust Education, Remembrance, and Research
- International Taekwon-Do Federation
- World Tennis, formerly known as the International Tennis Federation
- International Transport Forum, an intergovernmental organization within the OECD (Organisation for Economic Co-operation and Development)
- International Transport Workers' Federation, worldwide confederation of transport trade unions
- International Tree Foundation
- International Trombone Festival, music festival organised by the International Trombone Association
- Iraqi Turkmen Front

== See also ==
- ITFS
