= Audit trail =

Record of activities

An audit trail (also called audit log) is a security-relevant chronological record, set of records, and/or destination and source of records that provide documentary evidence of the sequence of activities that have affected at any time a specific operation, procedure, event, or device. Audit records typically result from activities such as financial transactions, scientific research and health care data transactions, or communications by individual people, systems, accounts, or other entities.

The process that creates an audit trail is typically required to always run in a privileged mode, so it can access and supervise all actions from all users; a normal user should not be allowed to stop/change it. Furthermore, for the same reason, the trail file or database table with a trail should not be accessible to normal users. Another way of handling this issue is through the use of a role-based security model in the software. The software can operate with the closed-looped controls, or as a 'closed system', as required by many companies when using audit trail functionality.

== Industry uses ==
In telecommunications, the term means a record of both completed and attempted accesses and service, or data forming a logical path linking a sequence of events, used to trace the transactions that have affected the contents of a record.

In information or communications security, information audit means a chronological record of system activities to enable the reconstruction and examination of the sequence of events and/or changes in an event. Information put away or transmitted in paired structure that might be depended upon in court. An audit trail is a progression of records of computer data about a working framework, an application, or client exercises. Computer frameworks may have a few audit trails each gave to a specific sort of action. Related to proper apparatuses and systems, audit trails can help with distinguishing security infringement, execution issues and application issues. Routine log audits and investigation are valuable for distinguishing security episodes, approach infringement, fake movement, and operational issues soon after they have happened, and for giving information valuable to settling such issues. Audit logs can likewise be valuable for performing forensic investigation, supporting the associations inside examinations, setting up baselines, and distinguishing operational patterns and long run issues.

In nursing research, it refers to the act of maintaining a running log or journal of decisions relating to a research project, thus making clear the steps taken and changes made to the original protocol.

In accounting, it refers to documentation of detailed transactions supporting summary ledger entries. This documentation may be on paper or on electronic records.

In finance, it refers to an order (any firm indication of a willingness to buy or sell a security) tracking system, or consolidated audit trail, with respect to the trading of securities, that would capture order event information for orders in securities from the time of the receipt of an order, and further documenting the life of the order through the process of routing, modification, cancellation, and execution (in whole or in part) of the order.

In online proofing, it pertains to the version history of a piece of artwork, design, photograph, video, or web design proof in a project.

In clinical research, server based systems such as clinical trial management systems (CTMS) require audit trails. Anything regulatory or QA/QC related also requires audit trails.

In pharmaceutical manufacturing, it is a Good Manufacturing Practice regulatory requirement software generate audit trails, but not all software have audit trail functionality built-in. The first 'generic' audit trail generating software came out late 2021. The software is called Audit Trail Control, capable of fulfilling regulatory requirements for any software used in pharmaceutical manufacturing.

In voting, a voter-verified paper audit trail is a method of providing feedback to voters using a ballotless voting system.

In employment and human resources contexts, audit trails provide a documented record of investigative steps taken, including complaint intake, witness interviews, and remedial actions taken, specifically in cases involving allegations of misconduct, discrimination or harassment. According to the U.S. Equal Employment Opportunity Commission (EEOC), employers are required to conduct a "prompt and adequate investigation" and take "appropriate action based on the findings," making a reviewable audit trail central to demonstrating compliance.

== Regulatory requirements ==
Multiple regulatory frameworks require organizations to maintain audit trails for compliance purposes. The HIPAA Security Rule requires covered entities and business associates to implement hardware, software, and procedural mechanisms that record and examine activity in information systems containing electronic protected health information (ePHI). These audit controls, specified under the technical safeguards at 45 CFR 164.312(b), must capture information such as user logins, file accesses, and modifications to ePHI. A proposed update to the HIPAA Security Rule (NPRM, December 2024) would require covered entities to review audit logs at least once every 30 days to detect unauthorized access or other security incidents.

The Sarbanes-Oxley Act (SOX) requires publicly traded companies to maintain adequate internal controls over financial reporting, which in practice necessitates comprehensive audit trails for financial transactions and system access. The Payment Card Industry Data Security Standard (PCI DSS) Requirement 10 mandates that organizations track and monitor all access to network resources and cardholder data through logging mechanisms.

== See also ==
- Software assurance
- Software safety
- Logging (computing)
