= Quality control =

Processes that maintain quality at a constant level

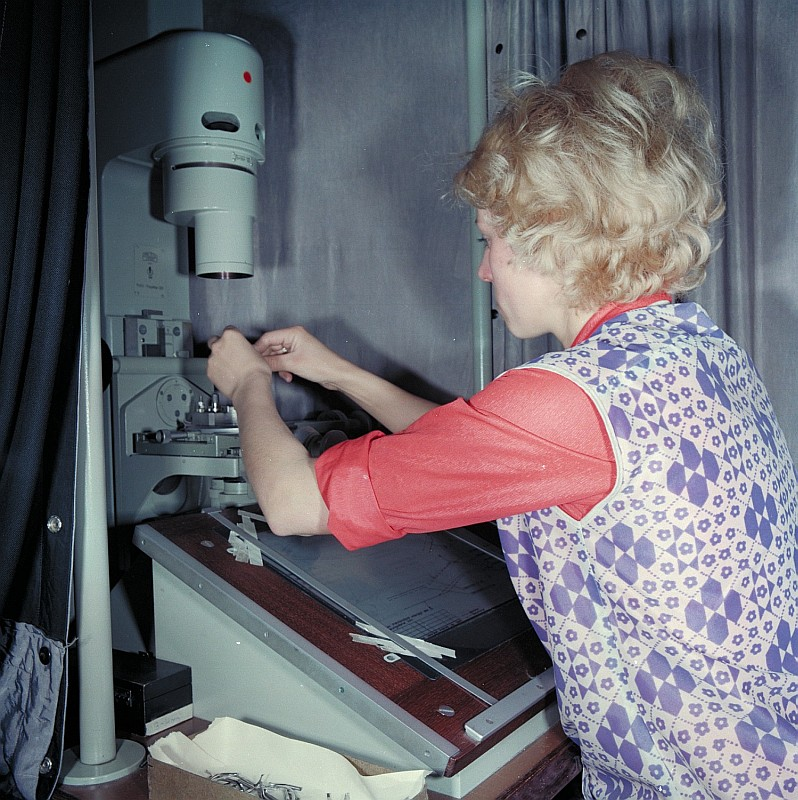
Quality inspector in a Volkseigener Betrieb sewing machine parts factory in Dresden, East Germany, 1977

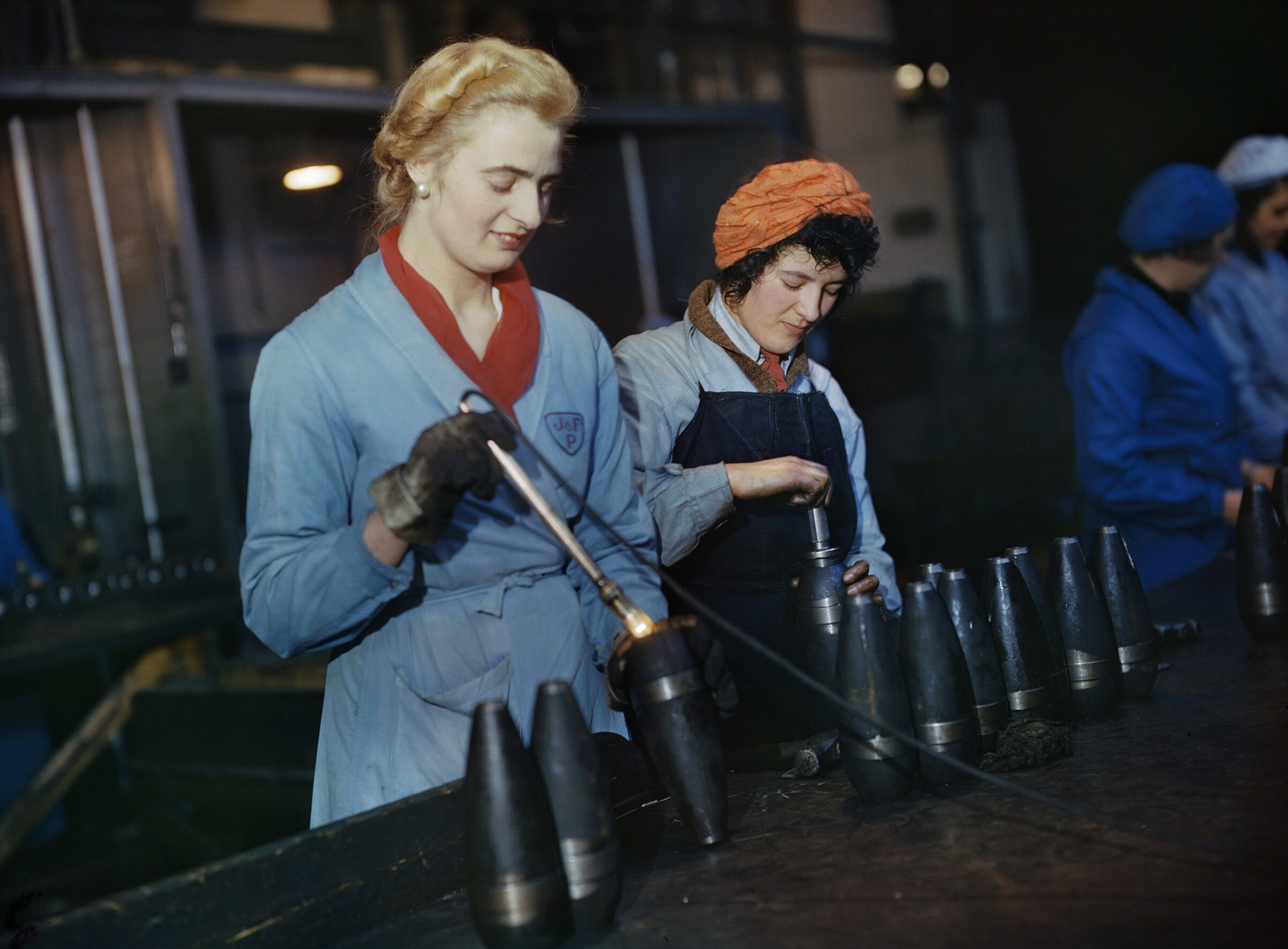
Munitions workers inspecting 3-inch mortar bombs, 1943

Quality control (QC) is a process by which entities review the quality of all factors involved in production. ISO 9000 defines quality control as "a part of quality management focused on fulfilling quality requirements".

This approach places emphasis on three aspects (enshrined in standards such as ISO 9001):

1. Elements such as controls, job management, defined and well managed processes, performance and integrity criteria, and identification of records
2. Competence, such as knowledge, skills, experience, and qualifications
3. Soft elements, such as personnel, integrity, confidence, organizational culture, motivation, team spirit, and quality relationships.

Inspection is a major component of quality control, where physical product is examined visually (or the end results of a service are analyzed). Product inspectors will be provided with lists and descriptions of unacceptable product defects such as cracks or surface blemishes for example.

== History and introduction ==
Early stone tools such as anvils had no holes and were not designed as interchangeable parts. Mass production established processes for the creation of parts and system with identical dimensions and design, but these processes are not uniform and hence some customers were unsatisfied with the result. Quality control separates the act of testing products to uncover defects from the decision to allow or deny product release, which may be determined by fiscal constraints. For contract work, particularly work awarded by government agencies, quality control issues are among the top reasons for not renewing a contract.

The simplest form of quality control was a sketch of the desired item. If the item did not match the sketch, the item was rejected, in a simple Go/no go procedure. However, manufacturers soon found it was difficult and costly to make parts be exactly like their depiction; hence around 1840 tolerance limits were introduced, wherein a design would function if its parts were measured to be within the limits. Quality was thus precisely defined using devices such as plug gauges and ring gauges. However, this did not address the problem of defective items; recycling or disposing of the waste adds to the cost of production, as does trying to reduce the defect rate. Various methods have been proposed to prioritize quality control issues and determine whether to leave them unaddressed or use quality assurance techniques to improve and stabilize production.

== Notable approaches ==
There is a tendency for individual consultants and organizations to name their own unique approaches to quality control—a few of these have ended up in widespread use:

Terminology	Approximate year of first use	Description
Statistical quality control (SQC)	1930s	The application of statistical methods (specifically control charts and acceptance sampling) to quality control
Total quality control (TQC)	1956	Popularized by Armand V. Feigenbaum in a Harvard Business Review article and book of the same name; stresses involvement of departments in addition to production (e.g., accounting, design, finance, human resources, marketing, purchasing, sales)
Statistical process control (SPC)	1960s	The use of control charts to monitor an individual industrial process and feed back performance to the operators responsible for that process; inspired by control systems
Company-wide quality control (CWQC)	1968	Japanese-style total quality control.
Total quality management (TQM)	1985	Quality movement originating in the United States Department of Defense that uses (in part) the techniques of statistical quality control to drive continuous organizational improvement
Six Sigma (6σ)	1986	Statistical quality control applied to business strategy; originated by Motorola
Lean Six Sigma (L6σ)	2001	Six Sigma applied with the principles of lean manufacturing and/or lean enterprise; originated by Wheat et al.

== In project management ==
In project management, quality control requires the project manager and/or the project team to inspect the accomplished work to ensure its alignment with the project scope. In practice, projects typically have a dedicated quality control team which focuses on this area.

== See also ==
- Analytical quality control
- Corrective and preventative action (CAPA)
- Eight dimensions of quality
- First article inspection (FAI)
- Good automated manufacturing practice (GAMP)
- Good manufacturing practice
- Quality assurance
- Quality management framework
- Standard operating procedure (SOP)
- QA/QC
