= PSW =

PSW may refer to:

- PSW Science, the oldest scientific society in Washington, D.C.
- Personal Support Worker, Canada
- PlayStation World, a UK magazine
- Program status word, a control register in IBM mainframe computers
- Baillie–PSW primality test in mathematics
- Part Submission Warrant in production part approval process
- Post Study Work Visa, UK
