= PPAP =

PPAP may refer to:

- Production part approval process, an automotive supply chain process
- 1-Phenyl-2-propylaminopentane, a catecholaminergic activity enhancer and psychostimulant drug
- "PPAP (Pen-Pineapple-Apple-Pen)", a 2016 single and viral video by Japanese singer and comedian Pikotaro

== See also ==
- PEPAP (phenethylphenylacetoxypiperidine), an opioid analgesic
