= QS9000 =

Quality standard in the automotive industry

QS9000 was a quality standard developed by a joint effort of the "Big Three" American automakers, General Motors, Chrysler and Ford. It was introduced to the industry in 1994. It has been adopted by several heavy truck manufacturers in the U.S. as well. Essentially all suppliers to the US automakers needed to implement a standard QS9000 system, before its termination.

== Description ==
The standard is divided into three sections with the first section being ISO 9001 plus some automotive requirements.

The second section is titled "Additional Requirements" and contains system requirements that have been adopted by all three automakers - General Motors, Chrysler and Ford.

The third section is titled the "Customer Specific Section" which contains system requirements that are unique to each automotive or truck manufacturer.

On December 14, 2006, all QS9000 certifications were terminated. With QS9000, the middle certification between ISO 9001 and ISO/TS 16949, no longer valid, businesses had a choice between either ISO9001 or TS16949. QS9000 is considered superseded by ISO/TS 16949, now a standard published by IATF, thus renamed IATF 16949:2016 (current version).

== See also ==
- ISO/TS 16949
- Advanced Product Quality Planning
