= Automotive engineering =

Discipline of engineering

Automotive engineering, along with aerospace engineering and naval architecture, is a branch of vehicle engineering, incorporating elements of mechanical, electrical, electronic, software, and safety engineering as applied to the design, manufacture and operation of motorcycles, automobiles, and trucks and their respective engineering subsystems. It also includes modification of vehicles. Manufacturing domain deals with the creation and assembling the whole parts of automobiles is also included in it. The automotive engineering field is research intensive and involves direct application of mathematical models and formulas. The study of automotive engineering is to design, develop, fabricate, and test vehicles or vehicle components from the concept stage to production stage. Production, development, and manufacturing are the three major functions in this field.

== Disciplines ==
=== Automobile engineering ===
Automobile engineering is a branch study of engineering which teaches manufacturing, designing, mechanical mechanisms as well as operations of automobiles. It is an introduction to vehicle engineering which deals with motorcycles, cars, buses, trucks, etc. It includes branch study of mechanical, electronic, software and safety elements. Some of the engineering attributes and disciplines that are of importance to the automotive engineer include:

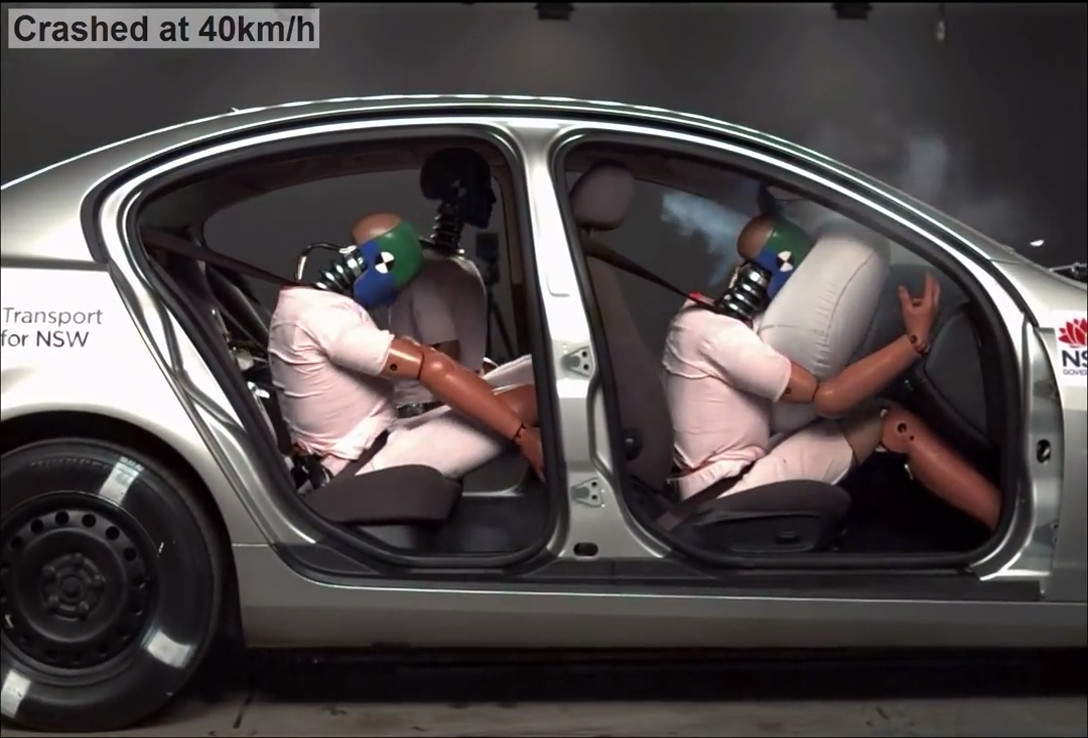
Crash test dummies showing airbag deployment and restraint operation during a 40 km/h impact.

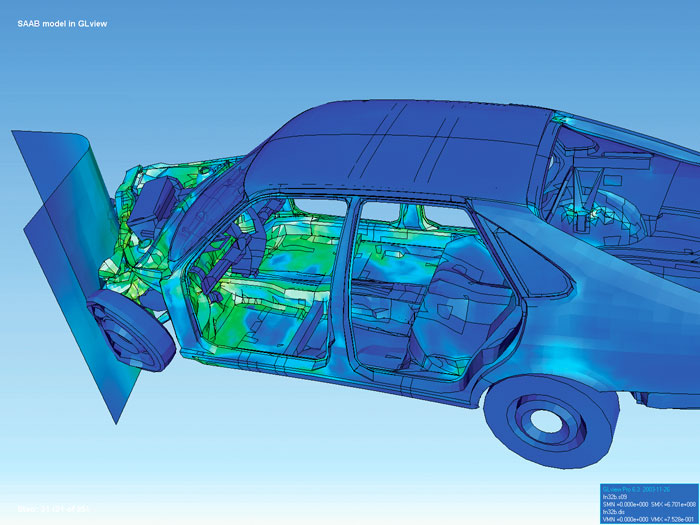
Visualization of how a car deforms in an Asymmetrical crash using finite element analysis.

Safety engineering: Safety engineering is the assessment of various crash scenarios and their impact on the vehicle occupants. These are tested against very stringent governmental regulations. Some of these requirements include: seat belt and air bag functionality testing, front and side-impact testing, and tests of rollover resistance. Assessments are done with various methods and tools, including computer crash simulation (typically finite element analysis), crash-test dummy, and partial system sled and full vehicle crashes.

Fuel economy/emissions: Fuel economy is the measured fuel efficiency of the vehicle in miles per gallon or kilometers per liter. Emissions-testing covers the measurement of vehicle emissions, including hydrocarbons, nitrogen oxides (NO_{x}), carbon monoxide (CO), carbon dioxide (CO_{2}), and evaporative emissions.

NVH engineering (noise, vibration, and harshness): NVH involves customer feedback (both tactile [felt] and audible [heard]) concerning a vehicle. While sound can be interpreted as a rattle, squeal, or hot, a tactile response can be seat vibration or a buzz in the steering wheel. This feedback is generated by components either rubbing, vibrating, or rotating. NVH response can be classified in various ways: powertrain NVH, road noise, wind noise, component noise, and squeak and rattle. Note, there are both good and bad NVH qualities. The NVH engineer works to either eliminate bad NVH or change the "bad NVH" to good (i.e., exhaust tones).

Vehicle electronics: Automotive electronics is an increasingly important aspect of automotive engineering. Modern vehicles employ dozens of electronic systems. These systems are responsible for operational controls such as the throttle, brake and steering controls; as well as many comfort-and-convenience systems such as the HVAC, infotainment, and lighting systems. It would not be possible for automobiles to meet modern safety and fuel-economy requirements without electronic controls. Recent vehicle electrical and electronic architectures also support software-defined vehicle functions through technologies such as high-performance computing platforms, standardized software architectures, onboard communication, over-the-air updates, and cybersecurity.

Performance: Performance is a measurable and testable value of a vehicle's ability to perform in various conditions. Performance can be considered in a wide variety of tasks, but it generally considers how quickly a car can accelerate (e.g. standing start 1/4 mile elapsed time, 0–60 mph, etc.), its top speed, how short and quickly a car can come to a complete stop from a set speed (e.g. 70-0 mph), how much g-force a car can generate without losing grip, recorded lap-times, cornering speed, brake fade, etc. Performance can also reflect the amount of control in inclement weather (snow, ice, rain).

Shift quality: Shift quality is the driver's perception of the vehicle to an automatic transmission shift event. This is influenced by the powertrain (Internal combustion engine, transmission), and the vehicle (driveline, suspension, engine and powertrain mounts, etc.) Shift feel is both a tactile (felt) and audible (heard) response of the vehicle. Shift quality is experienced as various events: transmission shifts are felt as an upshift at acceleration (1–2), or a downshift maneuver in passing (4–2). Shift engagements of the vehicle are also evaluated, as in Park to Reverse, etc.

Durability / corrosion engineering: Durability and corrosion engineering is the evaluation testing of a vehicle for its useful life. Tests include mileage accumulation, severe driving conditions, and corrosive salt baths.

Drivability: Drivability is the vehicle's response to general driving conditions. Cold starts and stalls, RPM dips, idle response, launch hesitations and stumbles, and performance levels all contribute to the overall drivability of any given vehicle.

Cost: The cost of a vehicle program is typically split into the effect on the variable cost of the vehicle, and the up-front tooling and fixed costs associated with developing the vehicle. There are also costs associated with warranty reductions and marketing.

Program timing: To some extent programs are timed with respect to the market, and also to the production-schedules of assembly plants. Any new part in the design must support the development and manufacturing schedule of the model.

Design for manufacturability (DFM): DFM refers to designing vehicular components in such a way that they are not only feasible to manufacture, but also such that they are cost-efficient to produce while resulting in acceptable quality that meets design specifications and engineering tolerances. This requires coördination between the design engineers and the assembly/manufacturing teams.

Quality management: Quality control is an important factor within the production process, as high quality is needed to meet customer requirements and to avoid expensive recall campaigns. The complexity of components involved in the production process requires a combination of different tools and techniques for quality control. Therefore, the International Automotive Task Force (IATF), a group of the world's leading manufacturers and trade organizations, developed the standard ISO/TS 16949. This standard defines the design, development, production, and (when relevant) installation and service requirements. Furthermore, it combines the principles of ISO 9001 with aspects of various regional and national automotive standards such as AVSQ (Italy), EAQF (France), VDA6 (Germany) and QS-9000 (USA). In order to further minimize risks related to product failures and liability claims for automotive electric and electronic systems, the quality discipline functional safety according to ISO/IEC 17025 is applied.

Since the 1950s, the comprehensive business approach total quality management (TQM) has operated to continuously improve the production process of automotive products and components. Some of the companies who have implemented TQM include Ford Motor Company, Motorola and Toyota Motor Company.

== Job functions ==
=== Development engineer ===
A development engineer has the responsibility for coordinating delivery of the engineering attributes of a complete automobile (bus, car, truck, van, SUV, motorcycle etc.) as dictated by the automobile manufacturer, governmental regulations, and the customer who buys the product.

Much like the Systems engineer, the development engineer is concerned with the interactions of all systems in the complete automobile. While there are multiple components and systems in an automobile that have to function as designed, they must also work in harmony with the complete automobile. As an example, the brake system's main function is to provide braking functionality to the automobile. Along with this, it must also provide an acceptable level of: pedal feel (spongy, stiff), brake system "noise" (squeal, shudder, etc.), and interaction with the ABS (anti-lock braking system)

Another aspect of the development engineer's job is a trade-off process required to deliver all of the automobile attributes at a certain acceptable level. An example of this is the trade-off between engine performance and fuel economy. While some customers are looking for maximum power from their engine, the automobile is still required to deliver an acceptable level of fuel economy. From the engine's perspective, these are opposing requirements. Engine performance is looking for maximum displacement (bigger, more power), while fuel economy is looking for a smaller displacement engine (ex: 1.4 L vs. 5.4 L). The engine size however, is not the only contributing factor to fuel economy and automobile performance. Different values come into play.

Other attributes that involve trade-offs include: automobile weight, aerodynamic drag, transmission gearing, emission control devices, handling/roadholding, ride quality, and tires.

The development engineer is also responsible for organizing automobile level testing, validation, and certification. Components and systems are designed and tested individually by the Product Engineer. The final evaluation is to be conducted at the automobile level to evaluate system to system interactions. As an example, the audio system (radio) needs to be evaluated at the automobile level. Interaction with other electronic components can cause interference. Heat dissipation of the system and ergonomic placement of the controls need to be evaluated. Sound quality in all seating positions needs to be provided at acceptable levels.

=== Manufacturing engineer ===
Manufacturing engineers are responsible for ensuring proper production of the automotive components or complete vehicles. While the development engineers are responsible for the function of the vehicle, manufacturing engineers are responsible for the safe and effective production of the vehicle. This group of engineers consist of process engineers, logistic coordinators, tooling engineers, robotics engineers, and assembly planners.

In the automotive industry manufacturers are playing a larger role in the development stages of automotive components to ensure that the products are easy to manufacture. Design for manufacturability in the automotive world is crucial to make certain whichever design is developed in the Research and Development Stage of automotive design. Once the design is established, the manufacturing engineers take over. They design the machinery and tooling necessary to build the automotive components or vehicle and establish the methods of how to mass-produce the product. It is the manufacturing engineers job to increase the efficiency of the automotive plant and to implement lean manufacturing techniques such as Six Sigma and Kaizen.

=== Other automotive engineering roles ===
Other automotive engineers include those listed below:

- Aerodynamics engineers will often give guidance to the styling studio so that the shapes they design are aerodynamic, as well as attractive.
- Body engineers will also let the studio know if it is feasible to make the panels for their designs.
- Change control engineers make sure that all of the design and manufacturing changes that occur are organized, managed and implemented...
- NVH engineers perform sound and vibration testing to prevent loud cabin noises, detectable vibrations, and/or improve the sound quality while the vehicle is on the road.

== The modern automotive product engineering process ==
Studies indicate that a substantial part of the modern vehicle's value comes from intelligent systems, and that these represent most of the current automotive innovation. To facilitate this, the modern automotive engineering process has to handle an increased use of mechatronics. Configuration and performance optimization, system integration, control, component, subsystem and system-level validation of the intelligent systems must become an intrinsic part of the standard vehicle engineering process, just as this is the case for the structural, vibro-acoustic and kinematic design. This requires a vehicle development process that is typically highly simulation-driven.

=== The V-approach ===
One way to effectively deal with the inherent multi-physics and the control systems development that is involved when including intelligent systems, is to adopt the V-Model approach to systems development, as has been widely used in the automotive industry for twenty years or more. In this V-approach, system-level requirements are propagated down the V via subsystems to component design, and the system performance is validated at increasing integration levels. Engineering of mechatronic systems requires the application of two interconnected "V-cycles": one focusing on the multi-physics system engineering (like the mechanical and electrical components of an electrically powered steering system, including sensors and actuators); and the other focuses on the controls engineering, the control logic, the software and realization of the control hardware and embedded software.

Modern automotive manufacturing and lifecycle operations across multi-vendor networks increasingly rely on federated digital thread architectures to maintain end-to-end data traceability. Because major original equipment manufacturers (OEMs), automotive Tier 1 suppliers , and certified aftermarket service and repair facilities operate on disparate software platforms, a federated approach links design specifications and maintenance records via open standards without requiring full data centralization or exposing proprietary intellectual property. This continuous data flow supports functional safety and quality compliance standards, such as ISO 26262, throughout an asset's operational lifespan.
