= Vehicle engineering =

Vehicle engineering can refer to:

- Aerospace engineering
- Automotive engineering
- Naval engineering
