= Okinawa Autotech =

Indian electric vehicle company

Okinawa Autotech Private Limited
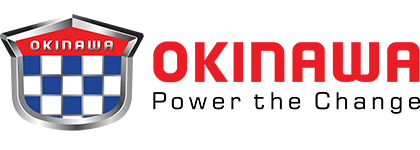
- Type: Private Limited Company
- Industry: Electric vehicles
- Founded: 2015; 11 years ago
- Founder: Jeetender Sharma; Dr. Rupali Sharma
- Headquarters: Gurgaon, Haryana, India
- Products: motorcycles
- Website: okinawascooters.com

Okinawa Autotech is an Indian electric vehicle company, headquartered in Gurgaon, Haryana. It was founded by Jeetender Sharma and Rupali Sharma in 2015.

== History ==
Okinawa Autotech was founded in 2015 by Jeetender Sharma, a veteran of the two-wheeler automobile industry, and his wife Rupali Sharma. In 2017 Okinawa Launched India's first high-speed electric scooter, the Okinawa Ridge. The first electric scooter was followed by the Okinawa iPraise in December 2017. After two years of market research, the first prototype of Okinawa's electric scooter was tested for 25,000 km on different road conditions across India.

In May 2019 Okinawa became the first company to get the FAME-II subsidy on its iPraise and Ridge+ models, both of which feature lithium-ion battries.

Its next electric scooter, the Okinawa Praise Pro was launched in September the same year, followed by the Okinawa Lite in November and the Okinawa R30 in August 2019. In January 2021, the company launched its first B2B electric scooter – the Okinawa Dual – with a view to propel services on wheels.

In June 2021, Okinawa received International Automotive Task Force (IATF) Certification.

== Production and infrastructure ==
=== First plant ===
Okinawa Autotech launched its mother plant in Bhiwadi, Rajasthan.

=== Second plant ===
In February 2022, Okinawa Autotech inaugurated its second manufacturing unit in Bhiwadi, Rajasthan. The company will be manufacturing 3 lakh electric vehicles per year at the new plant.

=== Third plant ===
The company expects to continue growing in the year ahead with its Mega plant already in process with a capacity of one million per year. The Mega Facility will bear the capacity of over 5 times the production of the current full capacity of the plant located in Alwar, Rajasthan.

== Products ==
=== Okhi-90 ===
The Okinawa Okhi-90 electric scooter launched on 25 March 2022 is a scooter aimed at city dwellers. The scooter has 16-inch aluminum alloy wheels. It is powered by 72V 50AH lithium-ion battery. It is powered by 3800 watt, central mounting motor with belt driven (IP-65), with a speed of 80–90 km/h.

=== iPraise+ ===
The iPraise+ electric scooter is light e-scooter with a range of 137 km per charge and a top speed of 50 km/h under ideal testing conditions and comes with a detachable battery. It is powered by 72V 50AH lithium-ion battery with 2700 watt BLDC motor.

=== PraisePro ===
The Okinawa PraisePro launched on 4 Sep 2022 is powered by 1000W BLDC motor with a 2.0 kWh lithium-ion detachable battery as well as a micro-charger with auto cut function.

=== Ridge+ ===
The Okinawa Ridge+ is powered by 60V 28AH lithium-ion battery with 800W BLDC motor. It comes with features like keyless entry, an anti theft alarm, e-ABS and "Find My Scooter" features.

=== Lite ===
The Okinawa Lite is the slow speed vehicle, powered by 250W waterproof BLDC motor with a top speed of 25 km/h and the ability to ascend a 7-degree grade. Its design had rounded corners, and it includes danger lights, and LED speedometer. Unique features on the Okinawa Lite include an anti-theft battery lock system and built-in pillion rider footrests.

=== R30 ===
The Okinawa R30 has a 250W BLDC motor and 1.25kWh lithium-ion battery. It can be fully charged in 4 to 5 hours using standard outlet. On a full charge the Okinawa R30 has a top speed of 25 km/h and a range of roughly 60 km.

=== Dual ===
Dual is Okinawa's first B2B electric scooter launched on 21 January 2021. With dual loading capacity on the front as well as the rear side of the vehicle, Okinawa Dual is designed to the requirements of the delivery industry. Okinawa Autotech also offers additional customized accessories such as delivery box, stackable crates, cold storage boxes for medicines, cylinder carrier and Lab on wheels that can carry these products.

== Galaxy Store ==
Galaxy store is Okinawa's Futuristic Experience Center. In December 2021, Okinawa launched its first Galaxy store in Dehradun followed by Jaipur, Delhi, Mumbai, Ahmedabad, Bhubaneswar and Noida. At Okinawa Galaxy, customer can experience the products and the story behind its making.

The Galaxy store is an attempt to connect the customers with the brand.

| Sr No | Name | Location | City | State | Launch Date |
|---|---|---|---|---|---|
| 1 | Dehradun Galaxy – Vinayak Motors | Ballupur Chowk | Dehradun | Uttarakhand | 6 Dec 2021 |
| 2 | Jaipur Galaxy – Jaipur Okinawa | Mansorovar | Jaipur | Rajasthan | 6 Feb 2022 |
| 3 | Delhi Galaxy – Moissanite Automobiles | Okhla Industrial Area | New Delhi | Delhi | 22 Feb 2022 |
| 4 | Mumbai Galaxy – Adiveer Automobiles | Nerul | Navi Mumbai | Maharashtra | 25 July 2022 |
| 5 | Ahmedabad Galaxy – Navin Autolink | Navrangpura | Ahmedabad | Gujarat | 7 Aug 2022 |
| 6 | Bhubaneswar Galaxy – Reston Okinawa | Nayapali | Bhubaneswar | Odisha | 5 Sep 2022 |
| 7 | Noida Galaxy – Moissanite Automobiles | Sector 63 | Noida | Uttar Pradesh | 9 Sep 2022 |

== See also ==
- Gogoro
- Hero MotoCorp
- Ola Electric
- Battery electric vehicle
- Plug-in electric vehicle
- Plug-in electric vehicles in India
