= EPA Methods =

The United States Environmental Protection Agency (EPA) maintains and approves test methods, which are approved procedures for measuring the presence and concentration of physical, chemical and biological contaminants; evaluating properties, such as toxic properties, of chemical substances; or measuring the effects of substances under various conditions. The methods in the Agency index are known as EPA Methods. There are other types of methods such as the ASTM and United States Pharmacopeia, but the EPA Methods are developed through a regulatory process involving public notice, comment and revision and are legally binding whereas ASTM methods are developed through a consensus process and compliance is voluntary. These methods are developed to help standardize and achieve the EPA mission to protect the environment and human health.

== Nomenclature ==
The method numbers generally range from 1 to 9000 and may have modification letters appended to the end, signifying a newer version of the method has been released. Some ranges of numbers appear to be organized with intention, for example methods 1-99 being air methods or the 7000s being for hazardous waste. Others number ranges, however, seem to only contain random methods, like the 300 and 400 series both being for wet chemistry methods.

== Searchable databases ==
EPA methods are listed by category on the EPA website. The US government keeps a collection of environmental testing methods at the National Environmental Methods Index website which includes EPA methods along with methods from other agencies like the USGS.

== See also ==
- Analytical chemistry
