= Advanced product quality planning =

Framework of procedures and techniques in product development

Advanced product quality planning (APQP) is a framework of procedures and techniques used to develop products in industry, particularly in the automotive industry. It differs from Six Sigma in that the goal of Six Sigma is to reduce variation but has similarities to Design for Six Sigma (DFSS).

According to the Automotive Industry Action Group (AIAG), the purpose of APQP is "to produce a product quality plan which will support development of a product or service that will satisfy the customer." It is a product development process employed by General Motors, Ford, Chrysler, and their suppliers.

== History ==
Advanced product quality planning is a process developed in the late 1980s by a commission of experts who gathered around the 'Big Three' of the US automobile industry: Ford, GM, and Chrysler.

Representatives from the three automotive original equipment manufacturers (OEMs) and the Automotive Division of American Society for Quality Control (ASQC) created the Supplier Quality Requirement Task Force for developing a common understanding on topics of mutual interest within the automotive industry.

This commission worked five years to analyze the then-current automotive development and production status in the US, Europe, and especially in Japan. At the time, the Japanese automotive companies were successful in the US market.

APQP is utilized by US automakers and some of their affiliates. Tier 1 suppliers are typically required to follow APQP procedures, techniques, and are also typically required to be audited and registered to IATF 16949. This methodology is also being used in other manufacturing sectors.

The Automotive Industry Action Group (AIAG) is a non-profit association of automotive companies founded in 1982. The basis for the process control plan is described in AIAG's APQP manual These include:

1. failure mode and effects analysis (FMEA) manual
2. statistical process control (SPC) manual
3. measurement systems analysis (MSA) manual
4. production part approval process (PPAP) manual

== Main content of APQP ==
APQP serves as a guide in the development process and also a standard way to share results between suppliers and automotive companies. APQP specifies three phases: Development, Industrialization, and Product Launch. Through these phases, 23 main topics will be monitored. These topics must be completed before the production is started. They include the following aspects: design robustness, design testing, and specification compliance, production process design, quality inspection standards, process capability, production capacity, product packaging, product testing, and operator training plan. These activities are sometimes carried out by third-party inspection and quality control companies such as SGS, Bureau Veritas, or QCADvisor, which provide on-site inspections, audits, and testing services to support APQP compliance.

APQP focuses on:

- Up-front quality planning
- Determining if customers are satisfied by evaluating the output and supporting continual improvement

APQP consists of five phases:

- Plan and define program
- Product design and development verification
- Process design and development verification
- Product and process validation and production feedback
- Launch, assessment, and corrective action

The APQP process has seven major elements:

- Understanding the needs of the customer
- Proactive feedback and corrective action
- Designing within the process capabilities
- Analyzing and mitigating failure modes
- Verification and validation
- Design reviews
- Control special/critical characteristics

== Adoption outside of automotive ==
The APQP framework has been adopted by the global wind energy industry through the formation of members organization APQP4Wind.

== See also ==
- Quality management
- Design For Manufacturing and Assembly (DFMA)
- Production part approval process (PPAP)
