= Test method =

Procedure that produces a test result

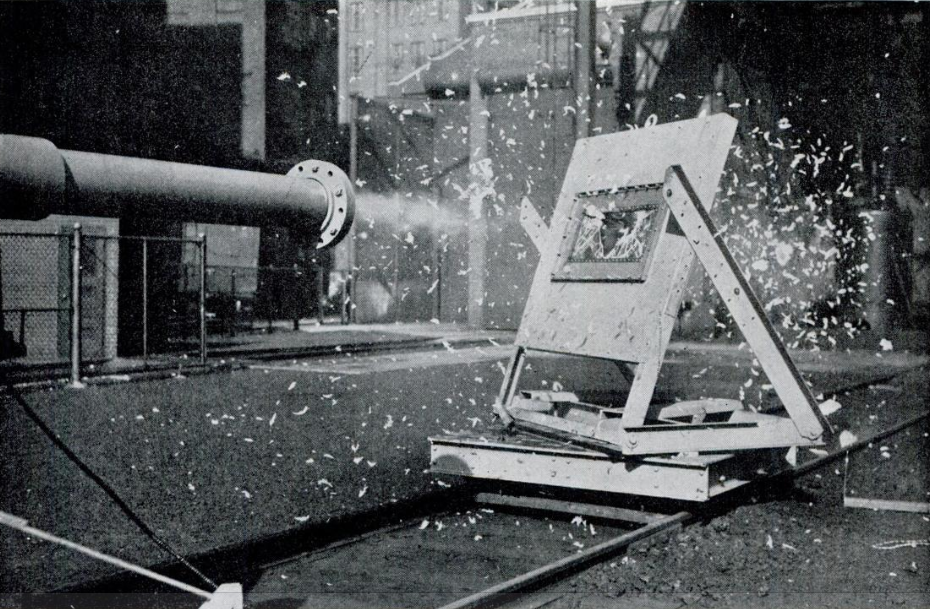
A "chicken gun" developed by the US CAA and the Westinghouse Electric and Manufacturing Corporation is fired at a piece of glass, demonstrating its use in testing aircraft components

A test method is a method for a test in science or engineering, such as a physical test, chemical test, or statistical test. It is a specified procedure that produces a test result. To ensure accurate and relevant results, a test method should be "explicit, unambiguous, and experimentally feasible.", as well as effective and reproducible.

A test is an observation or experiment that determines one or more characteristics of a given sample, product, process, or service, with the purpose of comparing the test result to expected or desired results. The results can be qualitative (yes/no), quantitative (a measured value), or categorical and can be derived from personal observation or the output of a precision measuring instrument.

Usually the test result is the dependent variable, the measured response based on the particular conditions of the test defined by the value of the independent variable. Some tests may involve changing the independent variable to determine the level at which a certain response occurs: in this case, the test result is the independent variable.

== Importance ==
In software development, engineering, science, manufacturing, and business, its developers, researchers, manufacturers, and related personnel must understand and agree upon methods of obtaining data and making measurements. It is common for a physical property to be strongly affected by the precise method of testing or measuring that property. As such, fully documenting experiments and measurements while providing needed documentation and descriptions of specifications, contracts, and test methods is vital.

Using a standardized test method, for example one published by a respected standards organization, is a good place to start. Sometimes it may be more useful to modify an existing test method or to develop a new one, although such home-grown test methods should be validated and in certain cases, demonstrate technical equivalency to primary, standardized methods. Again, documentation and full disclosure are necessary.

A well-written test method is important. However, even more important is choosing a method of measuring the correct property or characteristic. Not all tests and measurements are equally useful: usually a test result is used to predict or imply suitability for a certain purpose. For example, if a manufactured item has several components, test methods may have several levels of connections:

- test results of a raw material should connect with tests of a component made from that material
- test results of a component should connect with performance testing of a complete item
- results of laboratory performance testing should connect with field performance

These connections or correlations may be based on published literature, engineering studies, or formal programs such as quality function deployment. Validation of the suitability of the test method is often required.

== Content ==
Quality management systems usually require full documentation of the procedures used in a test. The document for a test method might include:

- descriptive title
- scope over which class(es) of items, policies, etc. may be evaluated
- date of last effective revision and revision designation
- reference to most recent test method validation
- person, office, or agency responsible for questions on the test method, updates, and deviations
- significance or importance of the test method and its intended use
- terminology and definitions to clarify the meanings of the test method
- types of apparatus and measuring instrument (sometimes the specific device) required to conduct the test
- sampling procedures (how samples are to be obtained and prepared, as well as the sample size)
- safety precautions
- required calibrations and metrology systems
- natural environment concerns and considerations
- testing environment concerns and considerations
- detailed procedures for conducting the test
- calculation and analysis of data
- interpretation of data and test method output
- report format, content, data, etc.

== Validation ==
Test methods are often scrutinized for their validity, applicability, and accuracy. It is very important that the scope of the test method be clearly defined, and any aspect included in the scope is shown to be accurate and repeatable through validation.

Test method validations often encompass the following considerations:

- accuracy and precision; demonstration of accuracy may require the creation of a reference value if none is yet available
- repeatability and reproducibility, sometimes in the form of a Gauge R&R.
- range, or a continuum scale over which the test method would be considered accurate (e.g., 10 N to 100 N force test)
- measurement resolution, be it spatial, temporal, or otherwise
- curve fitting, typically for linearity, which justifies interpolation between calibrated reference points
- robustness, or the insensitivity to potentially subtle variables in the test environment or setup which may be difficult to control
- usefulness to predict end-use characteristics and performance
- measurement uncertainty
- interlaboratory or round robin tests
- other types of measurement systems analysis

== See also ==
- Certified reference materials
- Data analysis
- Design of experiments
- Document management system
- EPA Methods
- Integrated test facility
- Measurement systems analysis
- Measurement uncertainty
- Metrication
- Observational error
- Replication (statistics)
- Sampling (statistics)
- Specification (technical standard)
- Test management approach
- Verification and validation
