= Program assurance =

Program assurance is a systematic approach to measure the likelihood of success of a program and proposing improvements that will ensure success.

For large programs assurance is typically independent. It may be undertaken by an external body that is a specialist in assurance services or an internal department that reports independently from the program manager. In both cases it generally provides an independent view of the program status to the program board or executive. For smaller programs program assurance may be undertaken from within the program or report into a portfolio office.

== Usage ==
- performing internal and independent reviews and assessments for program performance,
- ensuring implementation of robust risk management to address potential problems before they occur.

Program assurance also:

- Performs independent technical assessments of the systems engineering, quality assurance, lessons learned, technologies, production, and programmatic practices (cost, schedule, performance, quality, risk),
- Systematically performs independent assessments for overall mission-assured success,
- Monitors and measures a system safety program/process to determine its effectivemenss,
- Monitors and measures QA to assure implementation and determine effectiveness; and
- Assures a supplier quality assurance system, practice, or process is defined and implemented.

== Focus ==
The key difference between program assurance and program quality management or audit, is that program assurance tends to look at the potential impact of the program's approach.

Assurance may either focus on program delivery, program solutions or both may have equal weight. Within major IT programs external assurance often focuses on program delivery and would concentrate on program plans and capability. Where assurance also covers the solution this would include the business processes, systems, infrastructure, service and hosting. Solution may also cover the approach to design, delivery and implementation.

Program assurance tends to cover three separate styles of assurance: Continuous assurance throughout the life of the program; Point reviews or periodic reviews; focused reviews that concentrate on a particular aspect of a program. For very large programs all three would be undertaken with continuous assurance reporting to the program board on a regular basis, and point or focused reviews being undertaken at strategic points.
