= ANOVA gauge R&R =

Measurement systems analysis technique

ANOVA gauge repeatability and reproducibility is a measurement systems analysis technique that uses an analysis of variance (ANOVA) random effects model to assess a measurement system.

The evaluation of a measurement system is not limited to gauge but to all types of measuring instruments, test methods, and other measurement systems.

== Types ==
There are several types of gauge R&R studies. Two common methods are crossed, used to quantify measurement variability without using standards in cases where the same parts may be measured multiple times, and nested, used in cases where only one measurement is made per sample, particularly where the measurement is destructive. Expanded tests may be designed to assess multiple variables, such as different operators, different parts, and different measurement tools. Gauge R&R studies may also refer to test standards, if they exist, to account for systematic errors.

== Purpose ==
ANOVA gauge R&R measures the amount of variability induced in measurements by the measurement system itself, and compares it to the total variability observed to determine the viability of the measurement system. There are several factors affecting a measurement system, including:

- Measuring instruments, the gage or instrument itself and all mounting blocks, supports, fixtures, load cells, etc. The machine's ease of use, sloppiness among mating parts, and, "zero" blocks are examples of sources of variation in the measurement system. In systems making electrical measurements, sources of variation include electrical noise and analog-to-digital converter resolution.
- Operators (people), the ability and/or discipline of a person to follow the written or verbal instructions.
- Test methods, how the devices are set up, the test fixtures, how the data is recorded, etc.
- Specification, the measurement is reported against a specification or a reference value. The range or the engineering tolerance does not affect the measurement, but is an important factor in evaluating the viability of the measurement system.
- Parts or specimens (what is being measured), some items are easier to be measured than others. A measurement system may be good for measuring steel block length but not for measuring rubber pieces, for example.

There are two important aspects of a gauge R&R:

- Repeatability: The variation in measurements taken by a single person or instrument on the same or replicate item and under the same conditions.
- Reproducibility: the variation induced when different operators, instruments, or laboratories measure the same or replicated specimen.

It is important to understand the difference between accuracy and precision to understand the purpose of gauge R&R. Gauge R&R addresses only the precision of a measurement system. It is common to examine the P/T ratio which is the ratio of the precision of a measurement system to the (total) tolerance of the manufacturing process of which it is a part. If the P/T ratio is low, the impact on product quality of variation due to the measurement system is small. If the P/T ratio is larger, it means the measurement system is "eating up" a large fraction of the tolerance, in that the parts that do not have sufficient tolerance may be measured as acceptable by the measurement system. Generally, a P/T ratio less than 0.1 indicates that the measurement system can reliably determine whether any given part meets the tolerance specification. A P/T ratio greater than 0.3 suggests that unacceptable parts will be measured as acceptable (or vice versa) by the measurement system, making the system inappropriate for the process for which it is being used.

ANOVA gauge R&R is an important tool within the Six Sigma methodology, and it is also a requirement for a production part approval process (PPAP) documentation package. Examples of gauge R&R studies can be found in part 1 of Czitrom & Spagon.

There is not a universal criterion of minimum sample requirements for the GRR matrix, it being a matter for the quality engineer to assess risks depending on how critical the measurement is and how costly they are. The "10×2×2" (ten parts, two operators, two repetitions) is an acceptable sampling for some studies, although it has very few degrees of freedom for the operator component. Several methods of determining the sample size and degree of replication are used.

== Calculating variance components ==
In one common crossed study, 10 parts might each be measured two times by two different operators. The ANOVA then allows the individual sources of variation in the measurement data to be identified; the part-to-part variation, the repeatability of the measurements, the variation due to different operators; and the variation due to part by operator interaction.

The calculation of variance components and standard deviations using ANOVA is equivalent to calculating variance and standard deviation for a single variable but it enables multiple sources of variation to be individually quantified which are simultaneously influencing a single data set. When calculating the variance for a data set the sum of the squared differences between each measurement and the mean is calculated and then divided by the degrees of freedom (n – 1). The sums of the squared differences are calculated for measurements of the same part, by the same operator, etc., as given by the below equations for the part (SS_{Part}), the operator (SS_{Op}), repeatability (SS_{Rep}) and total variation (SS_{Total}).

$$SS_\text{Part} =n_\text{Op} \cdot n_\text{Rep} \sum \left(\bar{x}_{i\cdot\cdot} -\bar{x}\right)^2$$

$$SS_\text{Op} =n_\text{Part} \cdot n_\text{Rep} \sum \left(\bar{x}_{\cdot j\cdot} -\bar{x}\right)^2$$

$$SS_\text{Rep} =\sum \sum \sum \left(x_{ijk} -\bar{x}_{ij} \right)^2$$

$$SS_\text{Tot} =\sum \sum \sum \left(x_{ijk} -\bar{x}\right)^2$$

where n_{Op} is the number of operators, n_{Rep} is the number of replicate measurements of each part by each operator, $n_\text{Part}$ is the number of parts, x̄ is the grand mean, x̄_{i..} is the mean for each part, x̄_{·j·} is the mean for each operator, x_{ijk'} is each observation and x̄_{ij} is the mean for each factor level. When following the spreadsheet method of calculation the n terms are not explicitly required since each squared difference is automatically repeated across the rows for the number of measurements meeting each condition.

The sum of the squared differences for part by operator interaction (SS_{Part · Op}) is the residual variation given by

$$SS_{\text{Part}\,\cdot\,\text{Op}} =SS_\text{Tot} -SS_\text{Part} -SS_\text{Op} -SS_\text{Rep}$$

== See also ==
- Measurement uncertainty
- Random effects model
