= Round-robin test =

Test performed independently several times

In experimental methodology, a round-robin test is an interlaboratory test (measurement, analysis, or experiment) performed independently several times. This can involve multiple independent scientists performing the test with the use of the same method in different equipment, or a variety of methods and equipment. In reality it is often a combination of the two, for example if a sample is analysed, or one (or more) of its properties is measured by different laboratories using different methods, or even just by different units of equipment of identical construction.

A round-robin program is a measurement systems analysis technique which uses analysis of variance (ANOVA) random effects model to assess a measurement system.

== Round-robin tests regarding occupational safety and health ==
Companies are obliged to determine whether hazardous substances are in the air at the workplace by using appropriate measurements. To maintain the quality parameters for analytic procedures, the quality assurance methods are to be applied that are state-of-the-art. The Institute for Occupational Safety and Health of the German Social Accident Insurance (IFA) provides proficiency testing as support and assistance for the measuring stations worldwide for the purpose of self-examination and for the external presentation of quality standards. The PT schemes are conducted according to DIN EN ISO/IEC 17043 and DIN ISO 13528. The IFA organises the proficiency testing schemes in co-operation with the German association of environmental and OSH measurement bodies (BUA) and in collaboration with international partner institutes.

== Purpose ==
There are different reasons for performing a round-robin test:

- determination the reproducibility of a test method or process
- verification of a new method of analysis. If a new method of analysis has been developed, a round-robin test involving proven methods would verify whether the new method produces results that agree with the established method.
- providing basis, by interlaboratory testing, for certificates of quantitative analysis on a given material in certified reference materials production.

== Further info ==
- ASTM E691 Standard Practice for Conducting an Interlaboratory Study to Determine the Precision of a Test Method
- IUPAC: Round Robin Test on the Molecular Characterization of Epoxy Resins by Liquid Chromatography
- NIST/SEMATEK (2008) Handbook of Statistical Methods
