= Automotive Network Exchange =

Private extranet

The Automotive Network Exchange (ANX), a large private extranet that connects automotive suppliers to automotive manufacturers. Founded in 1995 by Automotive Industry Action Group (a consortium of major US auto companies), ANX since 1999 has been owned and operated by ANXeBusiness Corp., formerly a division of Leidos/SAIC but acquired in 2006 by One Equity Partners. Since 2006, ANX has expanded into other markets and now provides managed security, compliance assurance, and connectivity services to businesses in the healthcare and retail as well as automotive sectors.

== Overview ==
The Automotive Network Exchange is the private extranet initially set up and maintained by the Automotive Industry Action Group, Telcordia, General Motors, Ford, and Chrysler. It was built as a private network for the auto industry in 1995 to provide consistent, reliable speed and guaranteed security for data transmissions between the automakers and their suppliers. The ANX Network allows trading partners to collaborate electronically on product design and development; solicit and process orders; and facilitate just-in-time manufacturing and post shipping schedules. In 1999 the Automotive Industry Action Group sold the ANX Network to the Science Applications International Corporation (SAIC), at that time the corporation now operating as Leidos before it spun off SAIC as a separate entity in 2013. The division overseeing the ANX Network became ANXeBusiness. During the next six years, over 4,000 companies joined the ANX Network, making it one of the largest extranets in the world. In 2006, the private equity firm One Equity Partners acquired ANXeBusiness from Leidos/SAIC.

== Business drivers ==
The automotive industry is heavily dependent on collaboration between manufacturers and suppliers. These entities act as federated virtual companies for critical materials, parts, components, and services. High velocity supply chains are imperative to the success of these virtual companies. They must be flexible to accommodate the needs of the virtual automotive manufacturer, enabling the formation of “many-to-many” relationships, where trading partners can simultaneously subscribe to multiple model programs or opt out as the situation dictates. The ANX Network was designed, built and operated to deliver highly secure collaboration between strategic business partners.

== Technology ==
The ANX Network is a secure private network that uses standard, open Internet protocols but carries all traffic over private lines leased from various carriers. Through IPsec and end-to-end encryption, the ANX Network provides secure service to its customers like that of a typical virtual private network (VPN). It is different from a typical VPN in that the routers that make up its network check every packet to make sure it comes from an IP address on the private network. Thus, nobody but ANX customers can get into the network. Triple DES encryption protects a customer's data from the potential malicious behavior of another customer.
