= QA/QC =

Quality assurance and quality control

QA/QC is the combination of quality assurance, the process or set of processes used to measure and assure the quality of a product, and quality control, the process of ensuring products and services meet consumer expectations.

"Quality assurance" is process oriented and focuses on defect prevention, while "quality control" is product oriented and focuses on defect identification. The term 'defect' here refers to 'product defect'.

== See also ==
- Project management
- Quality management
