= Production part approval process =

Process in the automotive supply chain

Production part approval process (PPAP) is a standardized quality assurance process used primarily in the automotive supply chain for establishing confidence that a supplier's production processes can consistently produce parts meeting customer requirements. Although individual manufacturers have their own particular requirements, the Automotive Industry Action Group (AIAG) has developed a common PPAP standard as part of the Advanced Product Quality Planning (APQP) which encourages the use of common terminology and standard forms to document project status and minimize the risk of failure. The PPAP process is designed to demonstrate that a supplier has developed their design and production process to meet the client's requirements, minimizing the risk of failure by effective use of APQP. Requests for part approval must therefore be supported in official PPAP format and with documented results when needed.

The purpose of any Production Part Approval Process (PPAP) is to:

1. Ensure that a supplier can meet the manufacturability and quality requirements of the parts supplied to the customer
2. Provide evidence that the customer engineering design record and specification requirements are clearly understood and fulfilled by the supplier
3. Demonstrate that the established manufacturing process has the potential to produce the part that consistently meets all requirements during the actual production run at the quoted production rate of the manufacturing process.

== Critical elements of the Production Part Approval Process ==
1. Design record with all specification
2. Authorized engineering change number (ECN)
3. Customer Engineering Approval
4. Process is defined
5. Process is documented
6. Linkages of process are established
7. Process is monitored, analyzed, and improved based on data
8. Records are created, maintained, and retained
9. Validation Test Report
10. Control Plan
11. PFD (Process Flow Diagram)
12. Lab Test Report
13. DFMEA (Design Failure Mode and Effects Analysis)
14. PFMEA (Process Failure Mode and Effects Analysis)
15. MSA Study (measurement system analysis)
16. SPC (Statistical Process Control)

== PPAP approval ==
PPAP is a series of documents gathered in one specific location (a binder or electronically) called the "PPAP Package". The PPAP package is a series of documents which need a formal certification / sign-off by the supplier and approval / sign-off by the customer. The form that summarizes this package is called PSW (Part Submission Warrant). The signature in the customer certification area of the PSW indicates that the supplier-responsible person (usually the Quality Engineer or Quality Manager) has reviewed this package and that the customer-responsible person (usually a Customer Quality Engineer or Customer Quality Manager) has not identified any issues that would prevent its approbation.

The documentation on the PPAP package is closely related to the advanced product quality planning process used during the design and development of new vehicles and component systems to reduce the risk of unexpected failure due to errors in design and manufacture. The PPAP manual is published by the AIAG, and specifies generic requirements for obtaining PPAP approvals. Additional customer specific requirements may be imposed by particular clients (vehicle manufacturers) and incorporated in the purchasing contracts. Details of 'customer specific' requirements may be found on the International Automotive Task Force (IATF) website or supplier portals provided by the vehicle manufacturers.

Suppliers are required to obtain PPAP approval from the vehicle manufacturers whenever a new or modified component is introduced to production, or the manufacturing process is changed. Obtaining approval requires the supplier to provide sample parts and documentary evidence showing that:

1. The client's requirements have been understood;
2. The product supplied meets those requirements;
3. The process (including sub suppliers) is capable of producing conforming product;
4. The production control plan and quality management system will prevent non-conforming product reaching the client or compromising the safety and reliability of finished vehicles.

PPAP may be required for all components and materials incorporated in the finished product, and may also be required if components are processed by external sub-contractors.

The term ISIR (initial sample inspection report) is being used by German companies like VW and BMW. ISIR form is standardized by Verband der Automobile industries e. V., short VDA, a German interest group of the German automobile industry, both automobile manufacturers and automobile component suppliers. The term is also used by some other companies like Hyundai and Kia. In fact, ISIR is like the Warrant and Inspection Report of PPAP document package. PPAP document package includes some other document such as PFMEA, control plan, drawing, MSA, capability data etc. Besides ISIR document, other documents like that of PPAP is normally required by Volkswagen and Hyundai for release of a product and process. The PPAP is like the older ISIR plus a lot more, unless the customer has a specific requirement for using their ISIR within their system. ISIR is a summary of the initial sample being presented at what ever state. The PSW is supported and validated by the ISIR. This does not mean the product being presented is under serial conditions but just states with evidence the current status.

PPAP is the confirmation that the product meets the customer requirements for series production. The PPAP will be considered signed when a full PSW is approved by the customer and added to the PPAP folder. The PSW would always be supported with an ISIR but the PPAP is only considered approved when a FULL PSW is endorsed with an ISIR.

In essence the PSW and ISIR are part of PPAP or VDA and can even be outside of PPAP in cases such as first off tool parts which should be submitted in most cases with a PSW and ISIR but will not be approved in PPAP until series conditions are met.

== PPAP elements ==
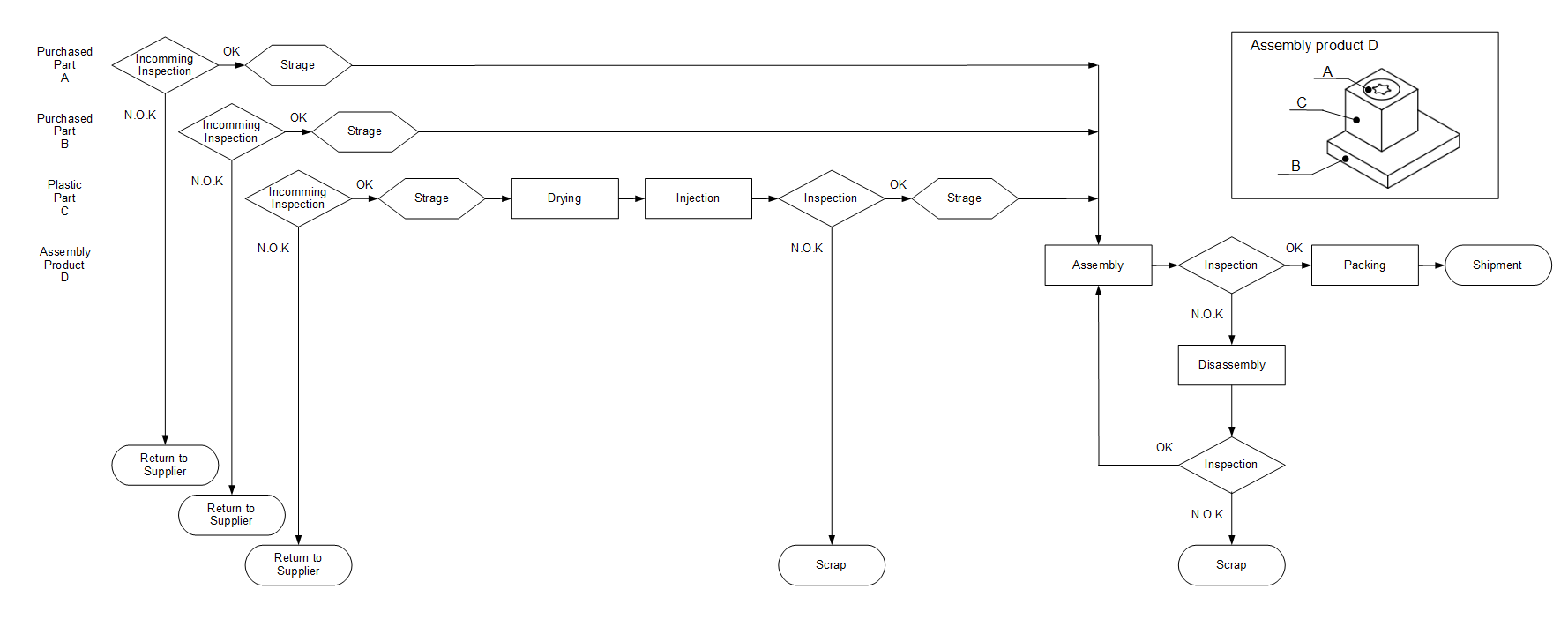
Example of process flow diagram

Below is the list of all 18 elements, and a brief description of them.

1. Design Records
  A printed copy of drawing needs to be provided. If the customer is responsible for designing, this is a copy of customer drawing that is sent together with the Purchase Order (PO). If supplier is responsible for designing this is a released drawing in supplier's release system. "Each and every feature must be "ballooned" or “road mapped” to correspond with the inspection results (including print notes, standard tolerance notes and specifications, and anything else relevant to the design of the part)."
2. Authorized Engineering Change (note) Documents
  A document that shows the detailed description of the change. Usually this document is called "Engineering Change Notice", but it may be covered by the customer PO or any other engineering authorization.
3. Engineering Approval
  This approval is usually the Engineering trial with production parts performed at the customer plant. A "temporary deviation" usually is required to send parts to customer before PPAP. Customer may require other "Engineering Approvals".
4. DFMEA
  A copy of the Design Failure Mode and Effect Analysis (DFMEA), reviewed and signed off by supplier and customer. If customer is design responsible, usually customer may not share this document with the supplier. However, the list of all critical or high impact product characteristics should be shared with the supplier, so they can be addressed on the PFMEA and Control Plan.
5. Process Flow Diagram
  A copy of the Process Flow, indicating all steps and sequence in the fabrication process, including incoming components.
6. PFMEA
  A copy of the Process Failure Mode and Effect Analysis (PFMEA), reviewed and signed off by supplier and customer. The PFMEA follows the Process Flow steps, and indicates "what could go wrong" during the fabrication and assembly of each component.
7. Control Plan
  A copy of the Control Plan, reviewed and signed off by supplier and customer. The Control Plan follows the PFMEA steps, and provides more details on how the "potential issues" are checked in the incoming quality, assembly process or during inspections of finished products.
8. Measurement System Analysis Studies (MSA)
  MSA usually contains the Gauge R&R for the critical or high impact characteristics, and a confirmation that gauges used to measure these characteristics are calibrated.
9. Dimensional Results
  A list of every dimension noted on the ballooned drawing. This list shows the product characteristic, specification, the measurement results and the assessment showing if this dimension is "ok" or "not ok". Usually a minimum of 6 pieces is reported per product / process combination.
10. Records of Material / Performance Tests
  A summary of every test performed on the part. This summary is usually on a form of DVP&R (Design Verification Plan and Report), which lists each individual test, when it was performed, the specification, results and the assessment pass / fail. If there is an Engineering Specification, usually it is noted on the print. The DVP&R shall be reviewed and signed off by both customer and supplier engineering groups. The quality engineer will look for a customer signature on this document.
  In addition, this section lists all material certifications (steel, plastics, plating, etc.), as specified on the print. The material certification shall show compliance to the specific call on the print.
11. Initial Process Studies
  Usually this section shows all Statistical Process Control charts affecting the most critical characteristics. The intent is to demonstrate that critical processes have stable variability and that is running near the intended nominal value.
12. Qualified Laboratory Documentation
  Copy of all laboratory certifications (e.g. A2LA, TS, NABL) of the laboratories that performed the tests reported on section 10.
13. Appearance Approval Report
  A copy of the AAI (Appearance Approval Inspection) form signed by the customer. Applicable for components affecting appearance only.
14. Sample Production Parts
  A sample from the same lot of initial production run. The PPAP package usually shows a picture of the sample and where it is kept (customer or supplier).
15. Master Sample
  A sample signed off by customer and supplier, that usually is used to train operators on subjective inspections such as visual or for noise.
16. Checking Aids
  When there are special tools for checking parts, this section shows a picture of the tool and calibration records, including dimensional report of the tool.
17. Customer-Specific Requirements
  Each customer may have specific requirements to be included on the PPAP package. It is a good practice to ask the customer for PPAP expectations before even quoting for a job. North American auto makers OEM (Original Equipment Manufacturer) requirements are listed on the IATF website.
18. Part Submission Warrant (PSW)
  This is the form that summarizes the whole PPAP package. This form shows the reason for submission (design change, annual revalidation, etc.) and the level of documents submitted to the customer. There is a section that asks for "results meeting all drawing and specification requirements: yes/no" refers to the whole package. If there are any deviations the supplier should note on the warrant or inform that PPAP cannot be submitted.

PPAP requirements are typically distinguished by level as follows:

- Level 1 – Part Submission Warrant (PSW) only submitted to the customer.
- Level 2 – PSW with product samples and limited supporting data.
- Level 3 – PSW with product samples and complete supporting data.
- Level 4 – PSW and other requirements as defined by the customer.
- Level 5 – PSW with product samples and complete supporting data available for review at the supplier's manufacturing location. Complete documentation

== See also ==
- Advanced Product Quality Planning (APQP)
- Failure Mode and Effects Analysis (FMEA)
- Process Flow Diagram
- Measurement Systems Analysis (MSA)
- Statistical Process Control (SPC)
