= Industry Technology Facilitator =

Industry Technology Facilitator (ITF) is an oil industry trade organisation established in 1999. It is owned by 30 major global oil majors and oilfield service companies.

The group has offices in Aberdeen, UK, Houston, USA, Abu Dhabi, UAE, Perth, Australia and Kuala Lumpur, Malaysia.

== Members ==
ITF currently has a membership of 30 global operators and service companies including:

- Aramco Services Company
- BG Group
- BP
- Chevron
- ConocoPhillips
- DONG Energy
- ENI
- EnQuest
- ExxonMobil
- GE Oil and Gas
- Kuwait Oil Company
- Maersk
- Marathon Oil Corporation
- Nexen
- Petrofac
- Petronas
- Petroleum Development Oman
- Premier Oil
- PTTEP
- QatarEnergy
- Schlumberger
- Shell
- Siemens
- Statoil
- Technip
- Total
- Tullow Oil
- Weatherford
- Wintershall
- Wood Group
- Woodside Energy

== Awards and recognition ==
- Alick Buchanan Smith Spirit of Enterprise: 2009 Winner – ITF
- Investors in People - Gold
- Scottish Offshore Achievement Awards: 2009 Rising Star Winner - Ryan McPherson
- IoD Scotland - Emerging Director Finalist: Neil Poxon

The topics addressed by these ITF sponsored technologies include seismic resolution, complex reservoirs, cost-effective drilling and intervention, subsea, maximising production, integrity management, and environmental performance.
