= Immuron =

Biotechnology company based in Melbourne, Australia

Immuron is a biotechnology company based in Melbourne, Australia. In 2008, the company changed its name to Immuron Limited, having previously operated as Anadis Limited.

Immuron is focused on antigen-primed and dairy-derived health products. Its proprietary technologies allow for rapid development of polyclonal antibody and other proteins-based solutions for a range of diseases.. The company specialises in nutraceutical, pharmaceutical and therapeutic technology products for conditions such as oral and GI mucositis, avian influenza, E. coli travellers' diarrhoea (TD) and Anthrax containment.

In 2005, Anadis signed an agreement with Quebec's Baralex Inc. and Valeo Pharma Inc. for the distribution of Travelan, a product made by Anadis for the Canadian market.
