= Measurement system analysis =

Assessment of a measurement process

A measurement system analysis (MSA) is a thorough assessment of a measurement process, and typically includes a specially designed experiment that seeks to identify the components of variation in that measurement process. Just as processes that produce a product may vary, the process of obtaining measurements and data may also have variation and produce incorrect results. A measurement systems analysis evaluates the test method, measuring instruments, and the entire process of obtaining measurements to ensure the integrity of data used for analysis (usually quality analysis) and to understand the implications of measurement error for decisions made about a product or process. Proper measurement system analysis is critical for producing a consistent product in manufacturing and when left uncontrolled can result in a drift of key parameters and unusable final products. MSA is also an important element of Six Sigma methodology and of other quality management systems. MSA analyzes the collection of equipment, operations, procedures, software and personnel that affects the assignment of a number to a measurement characteristic.

A measurement system analysis considers the following:

- Selecting the correct measurement and approach
- Assessing the measuring device
- Assessing procedures and operators
- Assessing any measurement interactions
- Calculating the measurement uncertainty of individual measurement devices and/or measurement systems

Common tools and techniques of measurement system analysis include: calibration studies, fixed effect ANOVA, components of variance, attribute gage study, gage R&R, ANOVA gage R&R, and destructive testing analysis. The tool selected is usually determined by characteristics of the measurement system itself. An introduction to MSA can be found in chapter 8 of Doug Montgomery's Quality Control book. These tools and techniques are also described in the books by Donald Wheeler and Kim Niles. Advanced procedures for designing MSA studies can be found in Burdick et al.

Equipment: measuring instrument, calibration, fixturing.

- People: operators, training, education, skill, care.
- Process: test method, specification.
- Samples: materials, items to be tested (sometimes called "parts"), sampling plan, sample preparation.
- Environment: temperature, humidity, conditioning, pre-conditioning.
- Management: training programs, metrology system, support of people, support of quality management system.

These can be plotted in a "fishbone" Ishikawa diagram to help identify potential sources of measurement variation.

== Goals ==
The goals of a MSA are:

1. Quantification of measurement uncertainty, including the accuracy, precision including repeatability and reproducibility, the stability and linearity of these quantities over time and across the intended range of use of the measurement process.
2. Development of improvement plans, when needed.
3. Decision about whether a measurement process is adequate for a specific engineering/manufacturing application.

== ASTM Procedures ==
The ASTM has several procedures for evaluating measurement systems and test methods, including:

- ASTM E2782 - Standard Guide for Measurement System Analysis
- ASTM D4356 - Standard Practice for Establishing Consistent Test Method Tolerances
- ASTM E691 - Standard Practice for Conducting an Interlaboratory Study to Determine the Precision of a Test Method
- ASTM E1169 - Standard Guide for Conducting Ruggedness Tests
- ASTM E1488 - Standard Guide for Statistical Procedures to Use in Developing and Applying Test Methods

== ASME Procedures ==
The American Society of Mechanical Engineers (ASME) has several procedures and reports targeted at task-specific uncertainty budgeting and methods for utilizing those uncertainty estimates when evaluating the measurand for compliance to specification. They are:

- B89.7.3.1 - 2001 Guidelines for Decision Rules: Considering Measurement Uncertainty Determining Conformance to Specifications
- B89.7.3.2 - 2007 Guidelines for the Evaluation of Dimensional Measurement Uncertainty (Technical Report)
- B89.7.3.3 - 2002 Guidelines for Assessing the Reliability of Dimensional Measurement Uncertainty Statements

== AIAG Procedures ==
The Automotive Industry Action Group (AIAG), a non-profit association of automotive companies, has documented a recommended measurement system analysis procedure in their MSA manual. This book is part of a series of inter-related manuals the AIAG controls and publishes, including:

- The measurement system analysis manual
- The failure mode and effects analysis (FMEA) and Control Plan manual
- The statistical process control (SPC) manual
- The production part approval process (PPAP) manual

Note that the AIAG's website has a list of "errata sheets" for its publications.

== See also ==
- Measurement uncertainty
- Round robin test
- Verification and validation
