= International Automotive Task Force =

Standards development organization

The International Automotive Task Force (IATF) is an ad hoc group of automotive manufacturers and related industry associations. Its aim is to "provide improved quality products to automotive customers worldwide".

According to the IATF, the specific purposes for which the IATF were established are:

1. Develop a consensus regarding international fundamental quality system requirements for production materials, products and services (e.g., heat treating, painting and plating).
2. Develop policies and procedures for the common IATF third party registration scheme to ensure consistency worldwide.
3. Provide appropriate training to support IATF 16949 requirements and the IATF registration scheme.
4. Establish formal liaisons with appropriate bodies to support IATF objectives.

The IATF developed IATF 16949, a quality management standard for the automotive industry, alongside the Automotive Industry Action Group (AIAG).

== Members ==
- Associazione Nazionale Filiera Industria Automobilistica (Italy)
- BMW Group
- BorgWarner
- Daimler AG
- DAF Trucks N.V.
- FCA Italy Spa
- FCA US LLC
- FIEV (France)
- Ford Motor Company
- General Motors
- MARUTI SUZUKI (INDIA)
- Newman Technology Inc.
- Groupe PSA
- Renault
- SMMT (U.K.)
- VDA (Germany)
- VE COMMERCIAL VEHICLES (INDIA)
- Volkswagen AG and its respective trade associations in the United States, such as AIAG.
- ZF (Germany)
- Mahindra (India)
- Geely Automobile (China)
- Seb Leblogauto.com (France)
- Okinawa Autotech (India)
