= Automotive Industry Action Group =

Not-for profit association

The Automotive Industry Action Group (AIAG) is a not-for-profit association founded in 1982 and based in Southfield, Michigan. It was originally created to develop recommendations and a framework for the improvement of quality in the North American automotive industry. The association's areas of interest have expanded to include product quality standards, bar code and RFID standards, materials management, EDI, returnable containers and packaging systems, and regulatory and customs issues.

The organization was founded by representatives of the three largest North American automotive manufacturers: Ford, General Motors and Chrysler. Membership has grown to include Japanese companies such as Toyota, Honda and Nissan, heavy truck and earth moving manufacturers such as Caterpillar Inc. and Navistar International, and many of their Tier One and sub-tier suppliers and service providers. Over 800 OEMs, parts manufacturers, and service providers to the industry are members.

AIAG's corporate governance relies on over 650 volunteers from various automotive companies who lend their expertise to working groups, subcommittees, and leadership roles. The AIAG staff supports the efforts of the volunteers and handles administrative roles. Executives on loan from OEMs and Tier One suppliers often provide key leadership roles in major initiatives and programs.

The AIAG publishes automotive industry standards and offers educational conferences and training to its members, including the advanced product quality planning (APQP) and production part approval process (PPAP) quality standards. These documents have become a de facto quality standard in North America that must be complied with by all Tier I suppliers. Increasingly, these suppliers are now requiring complete compliance from their suppliers, so that many Tier II and III automotive suppliers now also comply.

== Supply chain management ==
The automotive industry is dependent on a vast supply chain of companies that provide parts and components, including major subsystems, to manufacturers. The AIAG provides services to companies at all levels of the supply chain, including standardization efforts, to help manage complexity. Of particular interest is services to sub-tier suppliers - those suppliers who in turn supply Tier 1 or Tier 2 manufacturers - as their ranks were thinned by the severity of the automotive industry crisis of 2008–2010.

=== Customs, security, and trans-border parts flow ===
Government-sponsored initiatives including the Customs-Trade Partnership Against Terrorism (C-TPAT) and Partners in Protection (PIP) are cooperative programs aimed at strengthening and improving international supply chains and improving supply chain security. Automotive parts suppliers and OEMs have a substantial interest in efficient transportation of parts across borders, as supply chains in the North American market frequently cross the US-Canadian and US-Mexico boundaries. Supply chain security efforts to enhance the security of the supply chain by such activities as credentialing of participants in the supply chain, screening and validating of the contents of cargo being shipped, and advance notification of the contents to the destination country.

An AIAG initiative in customs and supply chain security seeks to address the issue of supply chain security by forming a centralized Web-based to identify the movement of finished goods, parts and materials through the automotive supply chain. This database, known as the 'Supply Safe-Supplier Security Assessment, provides a central repository for information which is shared as needed throughout the supply chain and to satisfy US Customs and Border Protection compliance requirements. The resulting effort is designed to allow shippers to use U.S. Customs Free and Secure Trade (FAST) lanes which enable faster processing of shipments through border patrol and fewer inspections.

=== Bar code standardization ===
The AIAG first developed standards for bar codes for automated tracking of parts through the supply chain in 1984 with a standard format called Code 39. Prior to that, each automotive manufacturer had used more than one format, requiring multiple bar codes and multiple readers for single parts. A variety of software vendors provide automated bar code and label generation software designed to help suppliers comply with common requirements.

Worldwide standards for barcoding have evolved due to consolidation, mergers, and supply chain practices in the industry. As of 2014, there are also bar code standards in use developed by General Motors (GM1724), the Odette "Global Transport Label", and the German Verband der Automobilindustrie VDA-4902.

=== MMOG/LE ===
MMOG/LE (short for Materials Management Operations Guideline / Logistics Evaluation) is a self-assessment tool used by auto suppliers to score their competency in materials handling and logistics. Developed by AIAG, this self-survey is designed to validate that the supplier has robust material planning and delivery processes in place to support overall business objectives. It is a required component of many automotive supplier programs, including Ford, GM, Chrysler, JLR, PSA, Volvo car and Volvo Truck.

=== Returnable containers ===
Returnable and reusable containers are used by the automotive industry to transport parts through the automotive supply chain. The AIAG has working groups and programs focused on the development of initiatives in returnable container visibility, tracking, and needs calculation, container and packaging standardization, and other best practices related to increasing efficiency in containers and packaging management. Efforts in this area focus on reducing the cost of shipping containers and eliminating theft of empty containers which are valuable for the economic content of the component plastics they are made of. Efforts under study include pooling of use of containers (as is underway in European markets) and tagging of containers with RFID or bar codes for improved automation of container return.

=== Automotive Network Exchange ===
The Automotive Network Exchange is a private extranet initially set up and maintained by the Automotive Industry Action Group, Telcordia, General Motors, Ford, and Chrysler. It was launched in 1995 for the auto industry with a stated goal of providing consistent, reliable speed and guaranteed security for data transmissions between the automakers and their suppliers. The ANX Network was designed to allow trading partners to collaborate electronically on product design and development; solicit and process orders, and facilitate just-in-time manufacturing and post-shipping schedules.

In 1999 the Automotive Industry Action Group sold the ANX Network to the Science Applications International Corporation (SAIC), in the face of criticism about high costs and interoperability problems on the network. In 2006, the private equity firm One Equity Partners acquired ANXeBusiness from SAIC. Since 2006, ANX has expanded into the healthcare, retail, and automotive sectors.

== Quality ==
The quality efforts in the AIAG focus on industry-wide efforts to improve the production quality of parts suppliers at all tiers. The industry depends on a network of suppliers, many of which provide parts for multiple OEMs. Quality programs seek to provide industry-wide improvements in the development and production of automotive components, as well as to synchronize and minimize compliance and certification costs for suppliers that had otherwise faced multiple certifications of quality from multiple OEMs.

=== Advanced product quality planning ===
Advanced product quality planning (or APQP) is a framework of procedures and techniques used to develop products in the industry, particularly the automotive industry. It is quite similar to the concept of Design for Six Sigma (DFSS). It is a defined process for a product development system for General Motors, Ford, Chrysler and their suppliers. The purpose of APQP is "to produce a product quality plan which will support the development of a product or service that will satisfy the customer." A manual from AIAG describes the process in detail.

The APQP process was developed in the late 1980s by a commission of experts gathered from the 'Big Three' US automobile manufacturers: Ford, GM and Chrysler. This commission spent five years analyzing the then-current status of automotive development and production in the US, Europe and especially in Japan. At the time, Japanese automotive companies were seeing remarkable success in the US market

=== Production part approval process ===
Production part approval process (PPAP) is used in the automotive supply chain to establish confidence in component suppliers and their production processes, by demonstrating that: "....all customer engineering design record and specification requirements are properly understood by the supplier and that the process has the potential to produce product consistently meeting these requirements during an actual production run at the quoted production rate."

Although individual manufacturers have their own particular requirements, the AIAG has developed a common PPAP standard as part of the advanced product quality planning (APQP) process to encourage the use of common terminology and standard forms to document project status. The PPAP process is designed to demonstrate that the component supplier has developed their design and production process to meet the client's requirements, minimising the risk of failure.

== Corporate responsibility ==
AIAG's corporate responsibility work began in 2005 in an effort by the leadership of several AIAG member companies to provide shared leadership and messaging regarding corporate social responsibility in the automotive industry. An annual summit brings together industry leaders for education.

=== Conflict minerals ===
The Dodd–Frank Wall Street Reform and Consumer Protection Act, passed in July 2010, mandates that public companies report on their direct and indirect sources for "conflict minerals" - gold, tin, tantalum, and tungsten - in their SEC filings beginning in 2014. In response, the AIAG formed a working group to allow member companies to share resources in identifying conflict minerals throughout the supply chain. Suppliers can use the iPoint Conflict Minerals Platform to track their compliance and provide mandated quarterly reporting in support of the legislation.

These minerals are found in many automotive products, including fuel tanks, seat cushions, batteries, brake pads, radiators, sealants, glass and electronics. The task of complying with these new rules is estimated at anywhere from $3 billion to $16 billion across the entire US economy. Over 11,000 companies have registered with one of the conflict materials reporting platforms, iPoint, as of January 2014.

=== Managing chemicals in production processes ===
AIAG works with member companies to provide support for best practices in the management of chemicals in the production process. Ford Motor Company has taken a lead in this effort, lending an executive in 2012-2013 to lead up the effort.

=== Improving working conditions ===
Business for Social Responsibility (BSR), a non-profit that promotes social responsibility in businesses, worked with the AIAG in 2009 to develop programs and best practices relating to improving working conditions in the global automotive industry. The project was funded in part by the United States Department of State.

=== Antitrust considerations ===
As an industry group, the AIAG has undertaken policies to ensure that it and its members do not violate antitrust laws while engaged in AIAG-facilitated activities. These policies include the publication of times and dates of AIAG member meetings, recitation of its antitrust policy at meetings, and detailed meeting notes maintained for each meeting. Also prohibited at each meeting is a long list of anti-competitive behaviours, including any discussion of pricing, price fixing, allocation of sales, design and marketing, credit terms, supplier selection, trade secrets, and confidential or proprietary information.

== Related organizations ==
AIAG is a global organization, though its founding members are all American. AIAG is also a member of the Joint Automotive Industry Forum (JAIF). Other JAIF members include Europe's Odette International Ltd., the Japan Automobile Manufacturers Association and the Japan Auto Parts Industries Association. In Germany, the Verband der Automobilindustrie (VDA) promotes national standards.
