= IATF 16949 =

International standard for automotive management systems

International Automotive Task Force 16949 (IATF 16949) is an international standard for automotive management systems that is a widely adopted and standardized quality management system for the automotive sector. It was released in 1999 by International Organization for Standardization based on ISO 9001, and the first edition was published in June 1999 as ISO/TS 16949:1999. IATF 16949:2016 replaced ISO/TS 16949 in October 2016 by International Automotive Task Force. The goal of the standard is to provide for continual improvement, emphasizing defect prevention and the reduction of variation and waste in the automotive industry supply chain and assembly process. The standard was designed to fit into an integrated management system.

The standard was developed by International Automotive Task Force. It harmonises the country-specific regulations of quality management systems.

About 30 percent of the more than 100 existing motorcar manufacturers follow the requirements of the norm but especially the large Asian manufacturers have differentiated and have their own requirements for the quality management systems of their corporate group and their suppliers.

IATF 16949 applies to the design/development, production and, when relevant, installation and servicing of automotive-related products.

The requirements are intended to be applied throughout the supply chain. For the first time vehicle assembly plants will be encouraged to seek IATF 16949 [certification].

== Historical background ==
Many suppliers (OEMs) were asked by the car manufacturers to build and certify their quality management system according to the rules and regulations of their own country organizations, such as:

- VDA (Germany)
- AIAG (North America)
- AVSQ (Italy)
- FIEV (France)
- SMMT (UK)

But due to this regulation a supplier needed to provide two different certificates for Daimler and Chrysler (VDA 6.1 for Germany and QS 9000 America), even though the supplier delivered only to a single company. These complexities accelerated the need for harmonization.

== Contents of the specification ==
The aim of the standard is to improve the system and process quality to increase customer satisfaction, to identify problems and risks in the production process and supply chain, to eliminate their causes and to examine and take corrective and preventive measures for their effectiveness. The focus is not on the discovery, but on the avoidance of errors.

The ten main chapters of the standards are:

- Chapter 1: Scope
- Chapter 2: Normative References
- Chapter 3: Terms and Definitions
- Chapter 4: Context of the Organization
- Chapter 5: Leadership
- Chapter 6: Planning
- Chapter 7: Support
  Includes Resources (personnel, infrastructure, equipment), Competence, Communication and Documented Information (record retention, engineering specifications)
- Chapter 8: Operation
  Includes Requirements, Design & Development, Control of Production and Release of Products & Services
- Chapter 9: Performance Evaluation
- Chapter 10: Improvement

Scope :-The scope of IATF 16949 is fundamentally anchored in the automotive supply chain and acts as a specialized extension of ISO 9001:2015, meaning it cannot be implemented as a standalone standard. It specifically applies to organizations that manufacture customer-specified production parts, service parts, and accessory parts for the automotive industry, covering vehicles such as passenger cars, light commercial vehicles, heavy trucks, buses, and motorcycles. The standard is strictly site-specific, which means certification is granted only to locations where value-added manufacturing processes like assembly, heat treatment, welding, or painting actually take place. While remote support functions such as corporate headquarters or design centers are audited as part of the system, they cannot achieve certification independently of a manufacturing site. A critical aspect of the scope is that it encompasses the entire product lifecycle from the perspective of risk and safety, requiring the integration of core tools like APQP, PPAP, FMEA, MSA, and SPC to ensure process stability and capability. Within this framework, an organization is permitted to exclude requirements related to product design and development if they are not responsible for the part's specifications, but they are never allowed to exclude manufacturing process design, as the control over how a part is produced is central to the standard's integrity. Ultimately, the scope ensures that every certified site adheres to stringent quality and safety regulations while meeting specific customer requirements, fostering a culture of continuous improvement and defect prevention throughout the global automotive industry. The process-oriented approach to business processes that is addressed in the ISO 9001:2015 is the base of the standard. It looks at the business processes in a process environment in which there are interactions and interfaces that need to be recognized, mapped and controlled by the quality management system. Additionally the gateways to the exterior (to sub-suppliers, customers and to remote locations) are defined. The Standard distinguishes between customer-oriented processes, supporting processes and management processes. This process-oriented approach is intended to improve the overview of the whole process. This is not an isolated process, but a combination of all interacting business processes which affect the quality performance of a firm.

A key requirement of IATF 16949:2016 is the fulfillment of customer-specific requirements, set up by the automotive manufacturer in addition to the quality management system of their suppliers. This may have decisively contributed to the worldwide recognition of the IATF standard by many manufacturers.

== Certification ==
IATF 16949 certification can be applied throughout the supply chain in the automotive industry. Certification takes place on the basis of the certification rules issued by the International Automotive Task Force (IATF). The certificate is valid for three years and must be confirmed annually (as a minimum) by an IATF certified auditor (3rd Party Auditor) of an IATF recognized certification body. Re-certification is required at the expiry of the three-year period. Certification pursuant to IATF 16949 is intended to build up or enforce the confidence of a (potential) customer towards the system and process quality of a (potential) supplier. Today, a supplier without a valid certificate has little chance of supplying a Tier 1 supplier and certainly no chance of supplying a car manufacturer with standard parts, if indeed that OEM is a participating member of the IATF (most Japan OEM are members of JAMA and not members of the IATF).

Certification bodies include:-

- PRI Certification (USA, China & Japan)
- DQS (Germany)
- TÜV Rheinland (Germany)
- BSI Group (UK)
- Bureau Veritas (France)
- DNV GL (Norway)
- EAGLE Certification Group (USA)
- IFCE (NORTHERN IRELAND)
- SAI Global (Australia)
- SGS S.A. (Switzerland)
- TÜV NORD (Germany)
- TÜV SÜD (Germany)
- United Registrar of Systems (UK)
