= Partial stroke testing =

Safety testing procedure

Partial stroke testing (or PST) is a technique used in a control system to allow the user to test a percentage of the possible failure modes of a shut down valve without the need to physically close the valve. PST is used to assist in determining that the safety function will operate on demand. PST is most often used on high integrity emergency shutdown valves (ESDVs) in applications where closing the valve will have a high cost burden yet proving the integrity of the valve is essential to maintaining a safe facility. In addition to ESDVs PST is also used on high integrity pressure protection systems or HIPPS. Partial stroke testing is not a replacement for the need to fully stroke valves as proof testing is still a mandatory requirement.

== Standards ==
Partial stroke testing is an accepted petroleum industry standard technique and is also quantified in detail by regulatory bodies such as the International Electrotechnical Commission (IEC) and the Instrument Society of Automation (ISA). The following are the standards appropriate to these bodies.

- IEC61508 – Functional safety of electrical/electronic/programmable electronic safety-related systems
- IEC61511 – Functional safety – Safety instrumented systems for the process industry sector
- ANSI/ISA-84.00.01 – Functional safety: Safety instrumented systems for the process industry sector (an ANSI standard)

These standards define the requirements for safety related systems and describe how to quantify the performance of PST systems

== Measuring safety performance ==
IEC61508 adapts a safety life cycle approach to the management of plant safety. During the design phase of this life cycle of a safety system the required safety performance level is determined using techniques such as Markov analysis, FMEA, fault tree analysis and Hazop. These techniques allow the user to determine the potential frequency and consequence of hazardous activities and to quantify the level of risk. A common method for this quantification is the safety integrity level. This is quantified from one to four with level four being the most hazardous.

Once the SIL level is determined this specifies the required performance level of the safety systems during the operational phase of the plant. The metric for measuring the performance of a safety function is called the average probability of failure on demand (or PFD_{avg}) and this correlates to the SIL level as follows

SIL	PFD_{avg}
4	≥10^{−5} to <10^{−4}
3	≥10^{−4} to <10^{−3}
2	≥10^{−3} to <10^{−2}
1	≥10^{−2} to <10^{−1}

One method of calculating the PFD_{avg} for a basic safety function with no redundancy is using the formula

PFD_{avg} = [(1-PTC)×λ_{D}×(TI_{FC}/2)] + [PTC×λ_{D}×(TI_{PST}/2)]

Where:

PTC = Proof test coverage of the partial stroke test.

λ_{D} = The dangerous failure rate of the safety function.

TI_{FC} = The full closure interval, i.e. how often the valve must be full closed for testing.

TI_{PST} = The partial stroke test interval.

The proof test coverage is a measure of how effective the partial stroke test is and the higher the PTC the greater the effect of the test.

== Benefits ==
The benefits of using PST are not limited to simply the safety performance but gains can also be made in the production performance of a plant and the capital cost of a plant. These are summarised as follows

=== Safety benefits ===
Using PST can reduce the probability of failure on demand.

=== Production benefits ===
There are a number of areas where production efficiency can be improved by the successful implementation of a PST system:

- Extension of the time between compulsory plant shutdowns.
- Predicting potential valve failures facilitating the pre-ordering of spare parts.
- Prioritisation of maintenance tasks.

== Drawbacks ==
The main drawback of all PST systems is the increased probability of causing an accidental activation of the safety system thus causing a plant shutdown, this is the primary concern of PST systems by operators and for this reason many PST system remain dormant after installation. Different techniques mitigate for this issue in different manners but all systems have an inherent risk

In addition in some cases, a PST cannot be performed due to the limitations inherent in the process or the valve being used. Further, as the PST introduces a disturbance into the process or system, it may not be appropriate for some processes or systems that are sensitive to disturbances.

Finally, a PST cannot always differentiate between different faults or failures within the valve and actuator assembly thus limiting the diagnostic capability.

== Techniques ==
There are a number of different techniques available for partial stroke testing and the selection of the most appropriate technique depends on the main benefits the operator is trying to gain.

=== Mechanical Jammers ===
Mechanical jammers are devices where a device is inserted into the valve and actuator assembly that physically prevents the valve from moving past a certain point. These are used in cases where accidentally shutting the valve would have severe consequences, or any application where the end user prefers a mechanical device.

Typical benefits of this type of device are as follows:

- The devices assure metal-to-metal prevention of stroke past the specified set point.
- Unlike some electronic systems, there is no need to commission and calibrate controls or continually train personnel, resulting in additional significant cost savings.
- The devices are vibration resistant, making them highly reliable.
- The risk associated with having an ESD event occur at time of manual mechanical PST may be considered statistically insignificant and allows a rational consideration of the advantages mechanical devices offer.
- Modular design allows for addition of limit switches, potentiometers, remote control operation, etc.
- The test is a comprehensive test of the logic solver and all final elements, only the sensing elements of the safety function are not tested.
- The valve is tested at the designed operating speed as it simulates an ESD event
- Jammers have a very low probability of causing a spurious trip.

However, opinions differ whether these devices are suitable for functional safety systems as the safety function is offline for the duration of the test.

Modern mechanical PST devices may be automated.

Examples of this kind of device include direct interface products that mount between the valve and the actuator and may use cams fitted to the valve stem. An example of such a mechanical PST system:

Other methods include adjustable actuator end stops.

=== Pneumatic valve positioners ===
The basic principle behind partial stroke testing is that the valve is moved to a predetermined position in order to determine the performance of the shut down valve. This led to the adaptation of pneumatic positioners used on flow control valve for use in partial stroke testing. These systems are often suitable for use on shutdown valves up to and including SIL3. The main benefits are :

- Elimination of the cost of manual testing
- Tracking and records of the PST tests for an optimum Safety monitoring. When the positioner is connected to the Safety System, the date and result of the test are registered in the Sequence of Events, for Insurance purposes.
- Remote access to valve diagnostics from the control room, with action oriented reports for predictive maintenance.

The main benefit of these systems is that positioners are common equipment on plants and thus operators are familiar with the operation of these systems, however the primary drawback is the increased risk of spurious trip caused by the introduction of additional control components that are not normally used on on/off valves. These systems are however limited to use on pneumatically actuated valves.

=== Electrical relay systems ===
These systems use an electrical switch to de-energise the solenoid valve and use an electrical relay attached to the actuator to re-energise the solenoid coil when the desired PST point is reached.

=== Electronic control systems ===
Electronic control systems use a configurable electronic module that connects between the supply from the ESD system and the solenoid valve. In order to perform a test the timer de-energises the solenoid valve to simulate a shutdown and re-energises the solenoid when the required degree of partial stroke is reached. These systems are fundamentally a miniature PLC dedicated to the testing of the valve.

Due to their nature these devices do not actually form part of the safety function and are therefore 100% fail safe. With the addition of a pressure sensor and/or a position sensor for feedback timer systems are also capable of providing intelligent diagnostics in order to diagnose the performance of all components including the valve, actuator and solenoid valves.

In addition timers are capable of operating with any type of fluid power actuator and can also be used with subsea valves where the solenoid valve is located top-side.

=== Integrated solenoid valve systems ===
Another technique is to embed the control electronics into a solenoid valve enclosure removing the need for additional control boxes. In addition there is no need to change the control schematic as no dedicated components are required.
