= Shutdown valve =

Valve that automatically stops the flow of a hazardous fluid in a dangerous event

A shutdown valve (also referred to as SDV or emergency shutdown valve, ESV, ESD, or ESDV; or safety shutoff valve) is an actuated valve designed to stop the flow of a hazardous fluid upon the detection of a dangerous event. This provides protection against possible harm to people, equipment or the environment. Shutdown valves form part of a safety instrumented system. The process of providing automated safety protection upon the detection of a hazardous event is called functional safety.

Shutdown valves are primarily associated with the petroleum industry although other industries may also require this type of protection system. ESD valves are required by law on any equipment placed on an offshore drilling rig to prevent catastrophic events like the BP Horizon explosion in the Gulf of Mexico in 2010.

A safety shutoff valve should be fail-safe, that is close upon failure of any element of the input control system (such as temperature controllers, steam pressure controllers), air pressure, fuel pressure, current from a flame detector, or current from other safety devices such as low water cutoff, and high pressure cutoff.

A blowdown valve (BDV) is a type of shutdown valve designed to depressurize a pressure vessel by directing vapour to a flare, vent or blowdown stack in an emergency. BDVs fail-safe to the open position upon failure of the control system. The type of valve, type of actuation and performance measurement are similar to an ESD valve.

== Types ==
For fluids, metal seated ball valves are used as shut-down valves (SDV's). Use of metal seated ball valves leads to overall lower costs when taking into account lost production and inventory, and valve repair costs resulting from the use of soft seated ball valves which have a lower initial cost.

Straight-through flow valves, such as rotary-shaft ball valves, are typically high-recovery valves. High recovery valves are valves that lose little energy due to little flow turbulence. Flow paths are straight through. Rotary control valves, butterfly valves and ball valves are good examples.

For air intake shut down, two distinct types are commonly utilized, i.e. butterfly valves and swing gate or guillotine valves. Because diesel engines ignite fuel using compression instead of an electronic ignition, shutting off the fuel source to a diesel engine will not necessarily stop the engine from running. When an external hydrocarbon, such as methane gas, is present in the atmosphere, it can be sucked into a diesel engine causing overspeed or over revving, potentially leading to a catastrophic failure and explosion. When actuated, ESD valves stop the flow of air and prevent these failures.

== Actuation ==
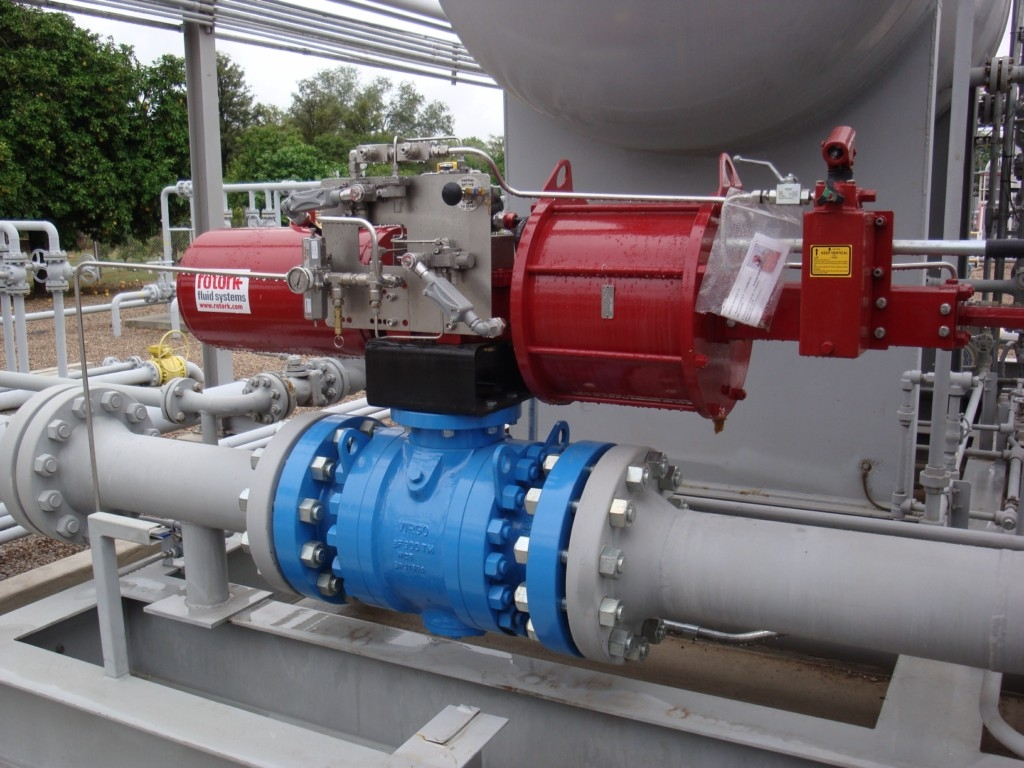
Pneumatically actuated shut down valve

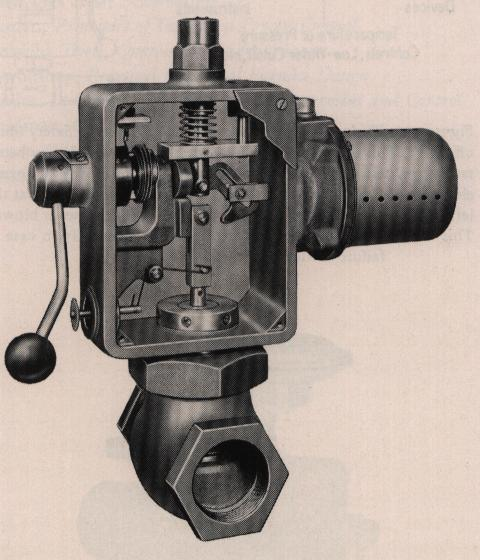
A diagram of the internal components of a safety shutoff valve. When this type of valve is tripped, the flow is quickly stopped and an indicator disc tells the operator that the electrical circuit has been opened by a failure somewhere in the system. When the system failure has been corrected so that the circuit is again closed, the valve can be opened by the action of the hand lever. If, however, the system failure has not been satisfactorily corrected, the circuit will remain open and moving the hand lever will not open the valve, because the valve stem remains disengaged from the handle.

As shutdown valves form part of a SIS it is necessary to operate the valve by means of an actuator. These actuators are normally fail safe fluid power type. Typical examples of these are:

- Pneumatic cylinder
- Hydraulic cylinder
- Electro-hydraulic actuator

In addition to the fluid type, actuators also vary in the manner in which the energy is stored to operate the valve on demand as follows:

- single-acting cylinder - Or spring return where the energy is stored by means of a compressed spring
- double-acting cylinder - Energy is stored using a volume of compressed fluid

The type of actuation required depends upon the application, site facilities and also the physical space available although the majority of actuators used for shutdown valves are of the spring return type due to the fail safe nature of spring return systems.

In a solenoid-operated safety shutoff valve, a spring action closes the valve instantly when an electric current fails and the solenoid ceases to be energized. The solenoid circuit is generally arranged so that it is broken upon failure of any element of the system. This valve cannot be re-opened until the solenoid is again energized. The coil of the valve solenoid must be connected in series with all of the elements. For this to operate, fuel, air and steam pressure can be converted to electrical signals by means of bellows, a bourdon tube, or a diaphragm-operated mercury switch.

== Complications ==
However, sudden closing of a valve in a piping system may lead to water hammer or implosion so in special cases there may be additional items connected to the shutoff valve, such as a pressure relief valve or an aerator valve.

== Performance measurement ==
For shutdown valves used in safety instrumented systems it is essential to know that the valve is capable of providing the required level of safety performance and that the valve will operate on demand. The required level of performance is dictated by the Safety Requirements Specification, where eventually a Safety Integrity Level (SIL) is indicated. In order to maintain the level of performance required during the valve lifetime, the Safety Maintenance Manual prescription shall be fulfilled: one of the possible requests is to test the valve. Among the others 2 types of testing methods are:

- Proof test - A manual test that allows the operator to determine whether the valve is in the "as good as new" condition by testing for all possible failure modes and requires a plant shutdown
- Diagnostic Test - An automated on-line test that will detect a percentage of the possible failure modes of the shutdown valve. An example of this for a shutdown valve would be a partial stroke test. An example of a mechanical partial stroke test device can be found here.

The performance standard of ESDVs may include the specification and testing of a closure time (e.g. to close in less than 10 seconds) and the specification and measurement of an acceptable leakage rate of fluid through the closed valve.

== See also ==
- Pipeline transport
- Piping
- Unit operation
