= ISA 84.00.07 =

IEC 84.00.07 is a technical report developed by the ISA 84 standards panel. It defines the lifecycle and technical requirements for ensuring effective design of fire and gas detection systems for use in the process industries. The technical report provides a lifecycle for performance based design of fire and gas detection systems, listing out the steps involved in a performance based design and establishing requirements to be implemented for each step. The technical report also defines performance metrics for application to fire and gas detection systems. The performance metrics established in this report for fire and gas system effectiveness include coverage and safety availability.

== Scope ==
The technical report discusses fire and gas detector placement for process industry applications. The report does not include discussions on the attributes of fire detection signaling equipment or equipment that is activated upon detection of a fire or gas release, such as alarms, sprinklers, or chemical suppression systems. The process industries include industrial facilities that handle bulk chemicals, such as oil refining and upgrading, petrochemical, specialty chemical, pharmaceutical, pulp and paper, and non-nuclear power generation.

== History ==
In 2006, the ISA 84 committee developed a working group to study the issue of how fire and gas systems should be treated with respect to the IEC 61511 standard for safety instrumented systems. Many industry practitioners were having trouble utilizing the IEC 61511 standard for the design of fire and gas systems for two reasons: fire and gas systems are not 100% effective in detecting fires and gas releases (i.e., coverage is not 100%), and even if a fire or gas release is detected, the consequences of the incident are not prevented, they are only reduced (i.e., mitigative). As a result, the techniques and metrics shown in IEC 61511 are not adequate to perform fire and gas system design.

The ISA 84 committee formed a working group to study the issue. In 2010, this working group released the first version of the ISA 84.00.07 technical report that laid out new techniques and metrics that were required to effectively design FGS systems using the performance based techniques that underpin the IEC 61511 standard.

== The Technical Report ==
The technical report provides two primary guidance efforts. The first is the development of a lifecycle for the performance based design on Fire and Gas systems. This safety lifecycle includes the steps required to design a functionally safe fire and gas system, along with establishing the requirements of each of the steps. The technical report also defines the two metrics that define the effectiveness of fire and gas systems (as opposed to the single metric of safety integrity level (SIL) that is employed for safety instrumented systems (SIS)). These two metrics are coverage and safety availability.

The coverage of a fire and gas detection array is defined in two ways. Geographic coverage and scenario coverage. The geographic coverage is the fraction of the area of given elevation of interest where if a fire or a gas release were to occur (i.e., be centered) the fire or gas release would be detected by the fire and gas detection array. Geographic coverage is only concerned with the location and performance attributes of detection equipment and obstructions to the "view" of the equipment. Scenario coverage, on the other hand, is defined as the fraction of fire or gas release scenarios that if they were to occur, would be detected by the fire and gas detection array. Scenario coverage considers not only the location and attributes of the fire and gas detection equipment, but also considers the location, frequency, and dimensions of the fires and gas releases that can occur in a process facility. While scenario coverage provides a richer understanding of the performance of a fire and gas detection system, it also is more resource consuming to calculate.
