= Drive by wire =

Automotive technology

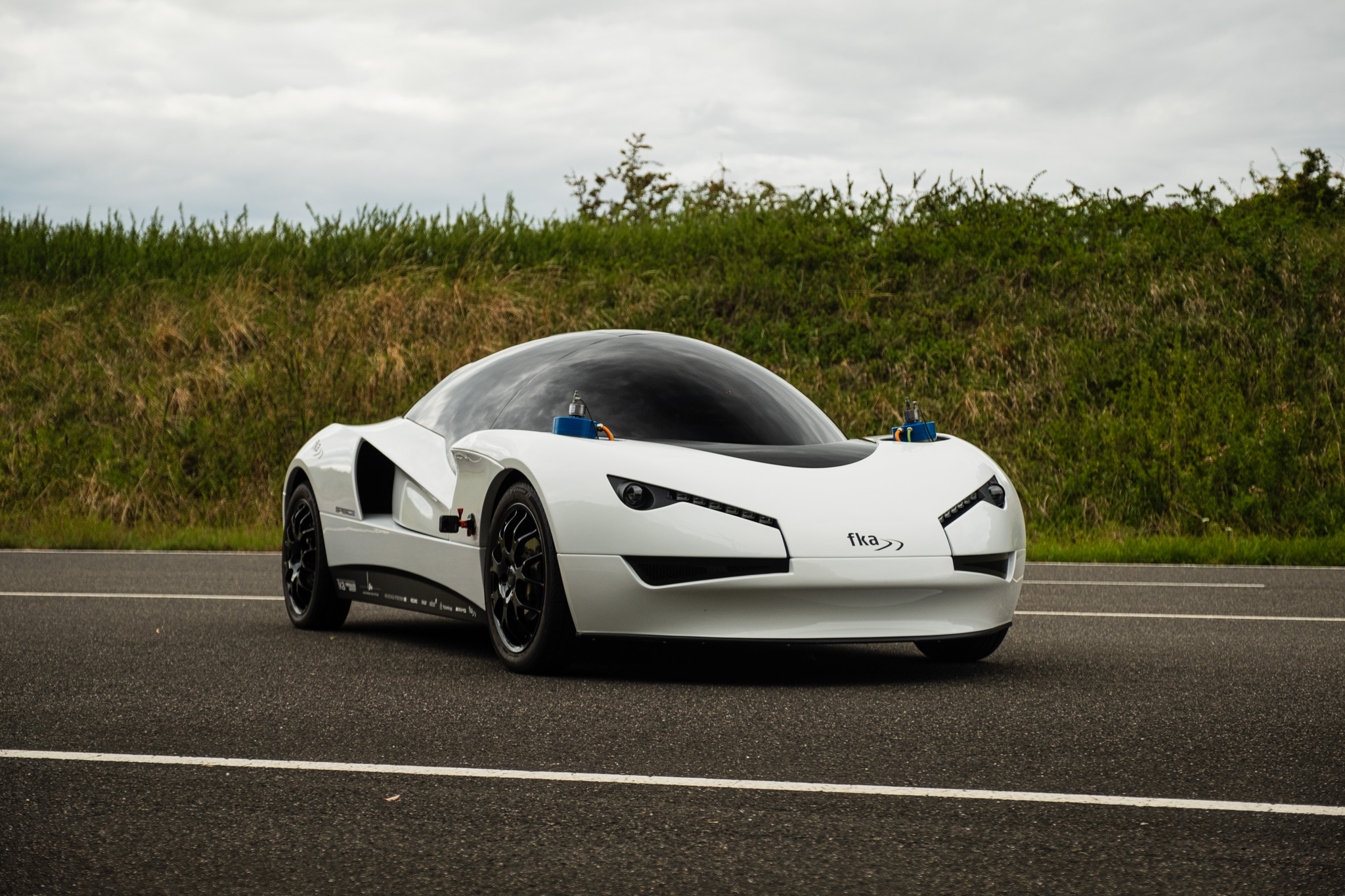
SpeedE, an academic concept car developed for studying drive-by-wire technologies

Drive by wire (DBW) in the automotive industry is the technology that uses electronics or electro-mechanical systems in place of mechanical linkages to control driving functions. The concept is similar to fly-by-wire in the aviation industry. Drive-by-wire may refer to just the propulsion of the vehicle through electronic throttle control, or it may refer to electronic control over propulsion as well as steering and braking, which separately are known as steer by wire and brake by wire, along with electronic control over other vehicle driving functions.

Driver input is traditionally transferred to the motor, wheels, and brakes through a mechanical linkage attached to controls such as a steering wheel, throttle pedal, hydraulic brake pedal, brake pull handle, and so on, which apply mechanical forces. In drive-by-wire systems, driver input does not directly adjust a mechanical linkage, instead the input is processed by an electronic control unit which controls the vehicle using electromechanical actuators. The human–machine interface, such as a steering wheel, yoke, accelerator pedal, brake pedal, and so on, may include haptic feedback that simulates the resistance of hydraulic and mechanical pedals and steering, including steering kickback. Components such as the steering column, intermediate shafts, pumps, hoses, belts, coolers, vacuum servos and master cylinders are eliminated from the vehicle. Safety standards for drive-by-wire are specified by the ISO 26262 standard level D.

== Properties ==
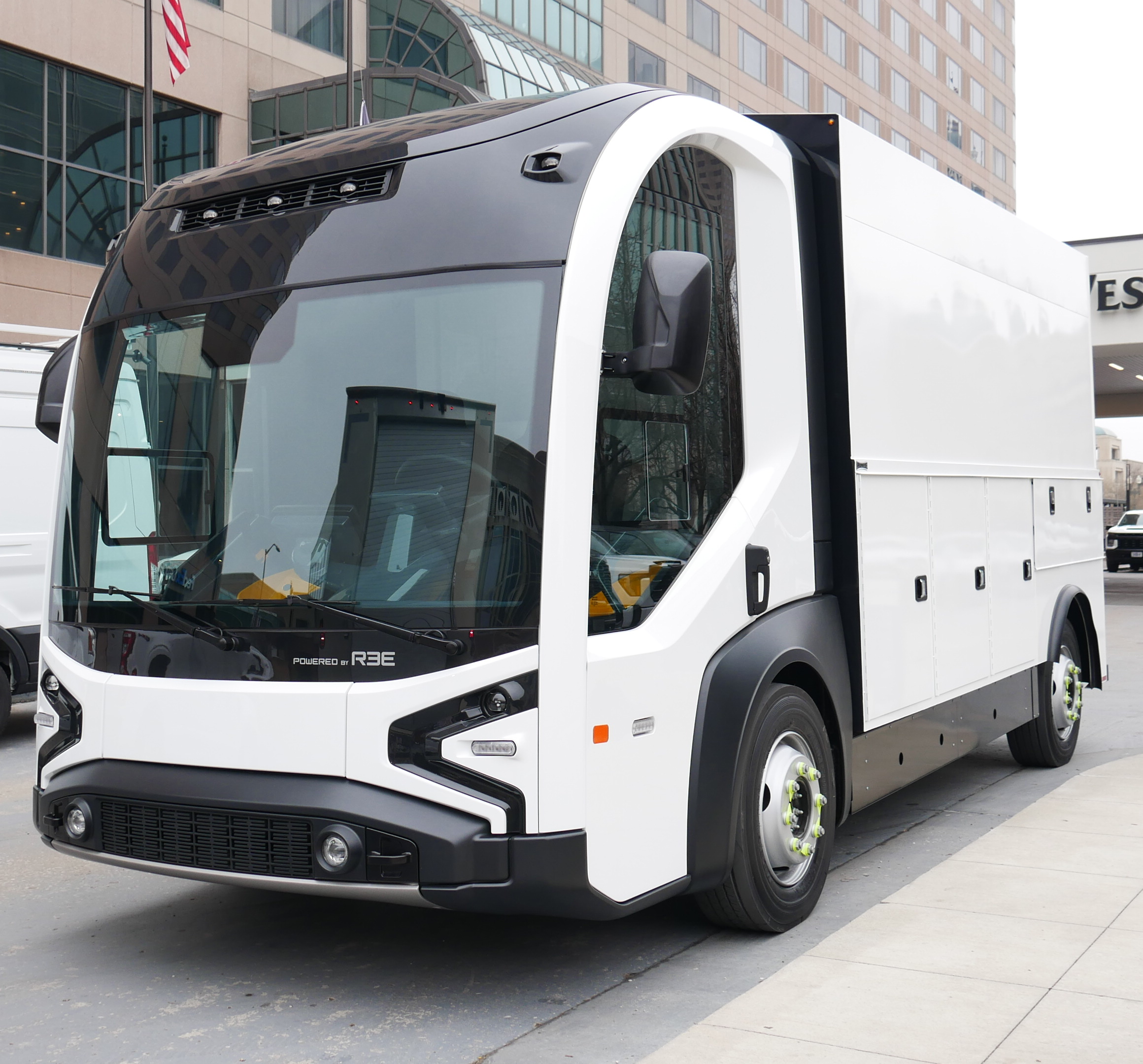
The REE P7-C truck is the first production vehicle to be road-certified in the United States with all by-wire controls, including drive, steer, brake, and park-brake by-wire, collectively called x-by-wire.

Dispensing with mechanical linkages has several advantages: it reduces complexity and simplifies assembly; simplifies service and tuning; reduces the force required to engage inputs and allows it to be customized with haptic technology; allows for more interior design freedom in the placement of input mechanisms; allows for automation of driving functions; reduces cabin noise by eliminating the acoustic linkage to the drive systems; and by reducing floor openings it improves the crash behavior of the vehicle. Because driver inputs can be overridden, safety can be improved by providing computer controlled intervention of vehicle controls with systems such as electronic stability control (ESC), adaptive cruise control and lane assist systems.

Each drive-by-wire system leads to more actuators in the vehicle and therefore greater energy consumption. For instance, the drive-by-wire technology adds actuator motors to create the torque needed to turn the wheels, and a feedback transducer to create the "road feel" on the steering wheel.

Safety considerations require redundancy of driver input sensors, vehicle communication networks, actuators, and other systems. Automotive safety standards such as ISO 26262 require drive-by-wire fail-operational and fail-safe behaviors.

== Safety and security ==
Up-fitted drive-by-wire systems, such as the Paravan Space Drive, have been available since as early as 2003 for existing production vehicles. Space Drive II is equipped with a redundant power system and triple-redundant communications and processors.

Failures in drive by wire systems can lead to potential hazardous situations where safety depends entirely on the vehicle's failure mode. The Aachen University Institute for Motor Vehicles (ika – Institut für Kraftfahrzeuge Aachen), in collaboration with Mercedes-AMG and others, studies the operation, risks, and safety mechanisms of drive-by-wire systems through its drive-by-wire concept vehicle, SpeedE. Studied scenarios include loss of control over acceleration, brakes, or steering.

Early by-wire systems had mechanical backup systems in case the by-wire systems failed. The modern drive by wire paradigm dispenses with mechanical backups, and relies on redundancy, fail-operational systems, and other safety and security measures: computational redundancy through lockstep CPUs; functional redundancy through modular design where the failure of one module is compensated by an identical module, for example by torque vectoring to compensate for a failed steering or braking module; multi-sensor fault detection; self-isolation of damaged systems; and fault-tolerant communication. Such fail-safes are specified by the ISO 26262 standard level D.

Assessment and standardization of drive-by-wire computer security has also taken place. Researchers demonstrated in 2011 and 2013 that some systems in commercially available vehicles are susceptible to hacking, allowing for external control of the vehicle. Hacking demonstrations included remote activation of systems like the horn, windshield wipers, accelerator, brakes, and transmission. Modern standards such as the ISO/SAE 21434 standard and UNCE regulations 155, 156, and 157 require dedicated cryptographic modules that encrypt all communication between the ECUs and the drive system components.

== Systems ==
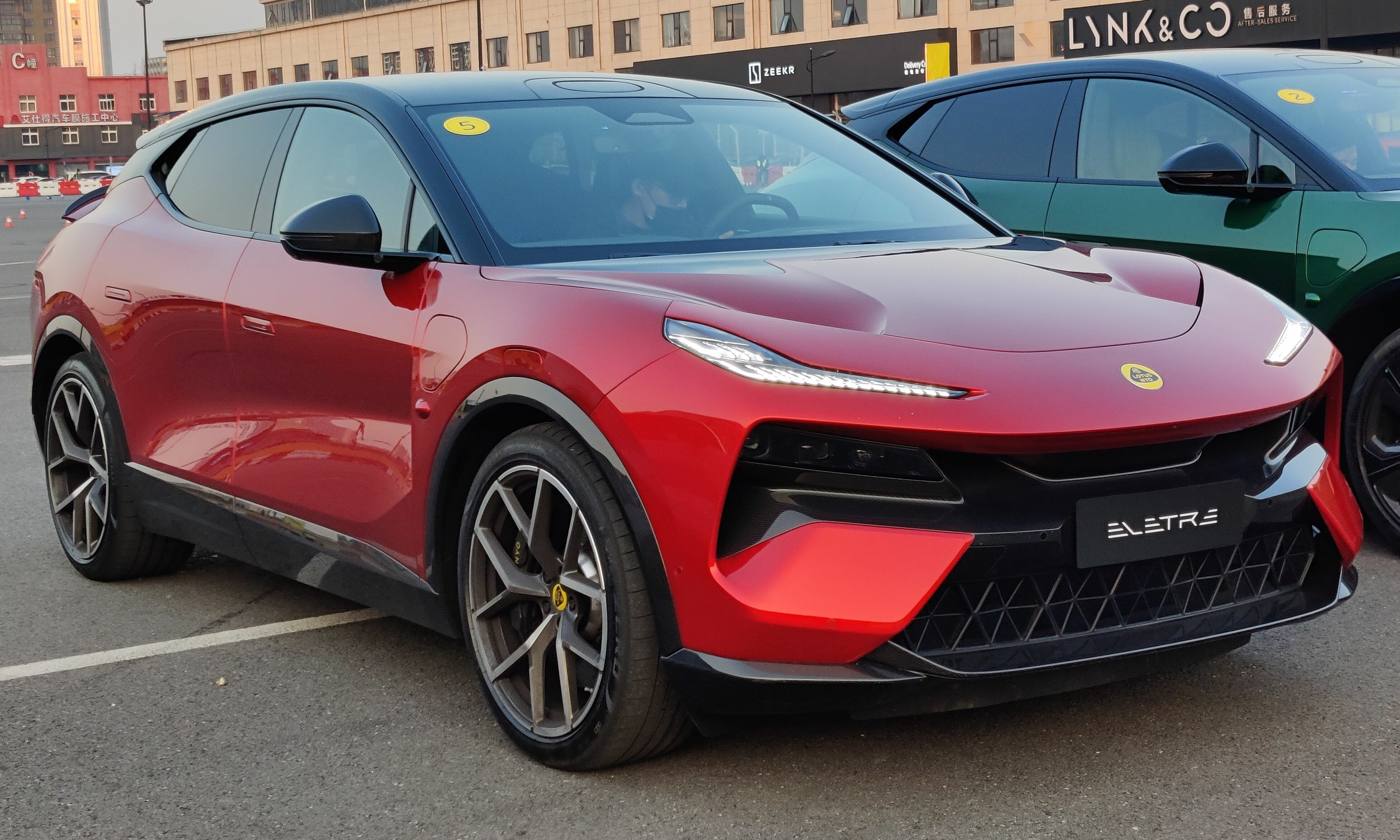
A model of the Lotus Eletre with drive-, steer-, and brake-by-wire provided by ZF Group was planned for 2025

=== Brake by wire ===
A brake-by-wire system eliminates the need for a mechanical connection that transfers force between the brakes and a driver input apparatus such as a pedal or lever. The three main types of brake-by-wire systems are: electronic parking brakes which have, since the turn of the 21st century, become more common; electro-hydraulic brakes (EHB) which can be implemented alongside legacy hydraulic brakes and as of 2020 have found small-scale usage in the automotive industry; and electro-mechanical brakes (EMB) that use no hydraulic fluid, which as of 2020 have yet to be successfully introduced in production vehicles due to their novel actuation methods.

=== Shift by wire ===
Shift-by-wire employs electrical or electronic connections that replace the mechanical connection between the driver's gearshift mechanism and the transmission. Since becoming commercially available in 1996, shift-by-wire has been commonly used in automated manual transmission, and has later been implemented in semi-automatic transmission and automatic transmission.

Park by wire may be considered a form of shift-by-wire. Not to be confused with park-brake by wire which engages a parking brake, park-by-wire engages the parking pawl. A parking pawl in a traditional automatic transmission has a mechanical link to the gear stick and locks the transmission in the park position when the gear-shift handle is set in "park". A park-by-wire system uses electronic commands sent to an actuator that engages the parking pawl.

=== Steer by wire ===
A vehicle equipped with a steer-by-wire system is able to steer some or all of its wheels without a steering column connected to the wheel axles. It is different from electric power steering or power-assist, as those systems still rely on the steering column to mechanically transfer some steering torque to the wheels.

A vehicle with a steer-by-wire system may be manually controlled by a driver through a steering wheel, a yoke, or any other steering apparatus which is connected to one or more electronic control units, which uses the input to control steering actuators that turn the wheels and steer the vehicle. The steering wheel or yoke may be equipped with haptic feedback to simulate road feel and wheel resistance, and change depending on the vehicle speed or customizable settings.

=== Throttle by wire ===
Accelerate-by-wire or throttle-by-wire, more commonly known as electronic throttle control, is a system that actuates vehicle propulsion without any mechanical connections, such as cables, from the accelerator pedal to the throttle valve of the engine or other propulsion systems. In electric vehicles, this system controls the electric motors by sensing the accelerator pedal input and sending commands to the power inverter modules.
