= Safety engineer =

Profession

Safety engineers focus on development and maintenance of the integrated management system. They act as a quality assurance and conformance specialist.

Health and safety engineers are responsible for developing and maintaining the safe work systems for employees and others.

== Scope of role ==
The scope of a safety engineer is the development and maintenance of the integrated management system. Safety engineering professionals must have a thorough understanding of legislation, standards and systems. They need to have a fundamental knowledge of safety, contract law, tort, environmental law, policy, health, construction, computer science, engineering, labour hire, plant hire, communication and psychology. Professional safety studies include construction and engineering, architectural design of systems, fire protection, ergonomics, system and process safety, system safety, safety and health program management, accident investigation and analysis, product safety, construction safety, education and training methods, measurement of safety performance, human behavior, environmental safety and health, and safety, health and environmental laws, regulations and standards. Many safety engineers have backgrounds or advanced study in other disciplines, such as occupational health and safety, construction management and civil engineering, engineering, system engineering / industrial engineering, requirements engineering, reliability engineering, maintenance, human factors, operations, education, physical and social sciences and other fields. This extends their expertise beyond the basics of health and safety.

== Personality and role ==
They must be personally pleasant, intelligent, and ruthless with themselves and their organisation. In particular, they have to be able to "sell" the failures that they discover to inspectors/ auditors, as well as the attendant expense and time needed to correct them. Often facts can be uncomfortable for the business.

Safety engineers have to be ruthless about getting facts right from others, this includes from their fellow managers and engineers. It is common for a safety engineer to consider registers, plant and equipment, training and competency problems in the same day. Often the facts can be very uncomfortable.

== Teamwork ==
Safety engineers work in a team that includes other engineering disciplines, project management, estimators, environmentalist, asset owners, regulators, doctors, auditors and lawyers.

Safety works well in a true risk matrix system, in which safety is a managed by the ISO3100 risk management system and integrated into the safety, quality and environment management systems. However, hierarchy of controls may be more suitable for smaller groups of less than 5 workers as it’s easier to digest.

== See also ==
- American Society of Safety Engineers
- Biomedical engineering
- Chemical engineering
- Fire protection engineering
- Hazard Identification
- Life-critical
- Redundancy (engineering)
- Reliability engineering
- Safety engineering
- Safety life cycle
- Security engineering
- Zonal Safety Analysis

== External links and sources ==
- Trevor Kletz (1998) Process Plants: A Handbook for Inherently Safer Design CRC ISBN 1-56032-619-0
- Frank Lees (2005). Loss Prevention in the Process Industries (3rdEdition ed.). Elsevier. ISBN 978-0-7506-7555-0.
- American Society of Safety Engineers (official website)
- Board of Certified Safety Professionals (official website)
- The Safety and Reliability Society (official website)
