= ISO 25119 =

International safety standard

ISO 25119, titled "Tractors and machinery for agriculture and forestry – Safety-related parts of control systems", is an international standard for functional safety of electrical and/or electronic systems that are installed in tractors and machines used in agriculture and forestry, defined by the International Organization for Standardization (ISO).

== Parts of ISO 25119 ==
ISO 25119 consists of following parts:

1. General principles for design and development
2. Concept phase
3. Series development, hardware and software
4. Production, operation, modification and supporting processes

== See also ==
- IEC 61508
