= IEC 62061 =

Machinery sector functional safety standard

IEC/EN 62061, ”Safety of machinery: Functional safety of electrical, electronic and programmable electronic control systems”, is the machinery specific implementation of IEC/EN 61508. It provides requirements that are applicable to the system level design of all types of machinery safety-related electrical control systems and also for the design of non-complex subsystems or devices.

The risk assessment results in a risk reduction strategy which in turn, identifies the need for safety-related control functions. These functions must be documented and must include:

- Functional requirements specification
- Safety integrity requirements specification

The functional requirements include details like frequency of operation, required response time, operating modes, duty cycles, operating environment, and fault reaction functions. The safety integrity requirements are expressed in levels called safety integrity level (SIL). Depending on the complexity of the system, some or all of the elements in Table 14 must be considered to determine whether the system design meets the required SIL.
