= IEC 61508 =

International standard for safety-related systems

IEC 61508 is an international standard published by the International Electrotechnical Commission (IEC) consisting of methods on how to apply, design, deploy and maintain automatic protection systems called safety-related systems. It is titled Functional Safety of Electrical/Electronic/Programmable Electronic Safety-related Systems (E/E/PE, or E/E/PES).

IEC 61508 is a basic functional safety standard applicable to all industries. It defines functional safety as: "part of the overall safety relating to the EUC (Equipment Under Control) and the EUC control system which depends on the correct functioning of the E/E/PE safety-related systems, other technology safety-related systems and external risk reduction facilities." The fundamental concept is that any safety-related system must work correctly or fail in a predictable (safe) way.

The standard has two fundamental principles:

1. An engineering process called the safety life cycle is defined based on best practices in order to discover and eliminate design errors and omissions.
2. A probabilistic failure approach to account for the safety impact of device failures.

The safety life cycle has 16 phases which roughly can be divided into three groups as follows:

1. Phases 1–5 address analysis
2. Phases 6–13 address realisation
3. Phases 14–16 address operation.

All phases are concerned with the safety function of the system.

The standard has seven parts:

- Parts 1–3 contain the requirements of the standard (normative)
- Part 4 contains definitions
- Parts 5–7 are guidelines and examples for development and thus informative.

Central to the standard are the concepts of probabilistic risk for each safety function. The risk is a function of frequency (or likelihood) of the hazardous event and the event consequence severity. The risk is reduced to a tolerable level by applying safety functions which may consist of E/E/PES, associated mechanical devices, or other technologies. Many requirements apply to all technologies but there is strong emphasis on programmable electronics especially in Part 3.

IEC 61508 has the following views on risks:

- Zero risk can never be reached, only probabilities can be reduced
- Non-tolerable risks must be reduced (ALARP)
- Optimal, cost effective safety is achieved when addressed in the entire safety lifecycle

Specific techniques ensure that mistakes and errors are avoided across the entire life-cycle. Errors introduced anywhere from the initial concept, risk analysis, specification, design, installation, maintenance and through to disposal could undermine even the most reliable protection. IEC 61508 specifies techniques that should be used for each phase of the life-cycle. The seven parts of the first edition of IEC 61508 were published in 1998 and 2000. The second edition was published in 2010.

== Hazard and risk analysis ==
The standard requires that hazard and risk assessment be carried out for bespoke systems: 'The EUC (equipment under control) risk shall be evaluated, or estimated, for each determined hazardous event'.

The standard advises that 'Either qualitative or quantitative hazard and risk analysis techniques may be used' and offers guidance on a number of approaches. One of these, for the qualitative analysis of hazards, is a framework based on 6 categories of likelihood of occurrence and 4 of consequence.

Categories of likelihood of occurrence

| Category | Definition | Range (failures per year) |
|---|---|---|
| Frequent | Many times in lifetime | > 10^{−3} |
| Probable | Several times in lifetime | 10^{−3} to 10^{−4} |
| Occasional | Once in lifetime | 10^{−4} to 10^{−5} |
| Remote | Unlikely in lifetime | 10^{−5} to 10^{−6} |
| Improbable | Very unlikely to occur | 10^{−6} to 10^{−7} |
| Incredible | Cannot believe that it could occur | < 10^{−7} |

Consequence categories

| Category | Definition |
|---|---|
| Catastrophic | Multiple loss of life |
| Critical | Loss of a single life |
| Marginal | Major injuries to one or more persons |
| Negligible | Minor injuries at worst |

These are typically combined into a risk class matrix

| | Consequence | | | |
| Likelihood | Catastrophic | Critical | Marginal | Negligible |
| Frequent | I | I | I | II |
| Probable | I | I | II | III |
| Occasional | I | II | III | III |
| Remote | II | III | III | IV |
| Improbable | III | III | IV | IV |
| Incredible | IV | IV | IV | IV |

Where:

- Class I: Unacceptable in any circumstance;
- Class II: Undesirable: tolerable only if risk reduction is impracticable or if the costs are grossly disproportionate to the improvement gained;
- Class III: Tolerable if the cost of risk reduction would exceed the improvement;
- Class IV: Acceptable as it stands, though it may need to be monitored.

== Safety integrity level ==
The safety integrity level (SIL) provides a target to attain for each safety function. A risk assessment effort yields a target SIL for each safety function. For any given design the achieved SIL is evaluated by three measures:

1. Systematic Capability (SC) which is a measure of design quality. Each device in the design has an SC rating. The SIL of the safety function is limited to smallest SC rating of the devices used. Requirement for SC are presented in a series of tables in Part 2 and Part 3. The requirements include appropriate quality control, management processes, validation and verification techniques, failure analysis etc. so that one can reasonably justify that the final system attains the required SIL.

2. Architecture Constraints which are minimum levels of safety redundancy presented via two alternative methods - Route 1h and Route 2h.

3. Probability of Dangerous Failure Analysis

=== Probabilistic analysis ===
The probability metric used in step 3 above depends on whether the functional component will be exposed to high or low demand:

- high demand is defined as more than once per year and low demand is defined as less than or equal to once per year (IEC-61508-4).
- For functions that operate continuously (continuous mode) or functions that operate frequently (high demand mode), SIL specifies an allowable frequency of dangerous failure.
- For functions that operate intermittently (low demand mode), SIL specifies an allowable probability that the function will fail to respond on demand.

Note the difference between function and system. The system implementing the function might be in operation frequently (like an ECU for deploying an air-bag), but the function (like air-bag deployment) might be in demand intermittently.

| SIL | Low demand mode: average probability of failure on demand | High demand or continuous mode: probability of dangerous failure per hour |
| 1 | ≥ 10^{−2} to < 10^{−1} | ≥ 10^{−6} to < 10^{−5} |
| 2 | ≥ 10^{−3} to < 10^{−2} | ≥ 10^{−7} to < 10^{−6} |
| 3 | ≥ 10^{−4} to < 10^{−3} | ≥ 10^{−8} to < 10^{−7} (1 dangerous failure in 1140 years) |
| 4 | ≥ 10^{−5} to < 10^{−4} | ≥ 10^{−9} to < 10^{−8} |

== IEC 61508 certification ==
Certification is third party attestation that a product, process, or system meets all requirements of the certification program. Those requirements are listed in a document called the certification scheme. IEC 61508 certification programs are operated by impartial third party organizations called certification bodies (CB). These CBs are accredited to operate following other international standards including ISO/IEC 17065 and ISO/IEC 17025. Certification bodies are accredited to perform the auditing, assessment, and testing work by an accreditation body (AB). There is often one national AB in each country. These ABs operate per the requirements of ISO/IEC 17011, a standard that contains requirements for the competence, consistency, and impartiality of accreditation bodies when accrediting conformity assessment bodies. ABs are members of the International Accreditation Forum (IAF) for work in management systems, products, services, and personnel accreditation or the International Laboratory Accreditation Cooperation (ILAC) for laboratory accreditation. A Multilateral Recognition Arrangement (MLA) between ABs will ensure global recognition of accredited CBs. IEC 61508 certification programs have been established by several global Certification Bodies. Each has defined their own scheme based upon IEC 61508 and other functional safety standards. The scheme lists the referenced standards and specifies procedures which describes their test methods, surveillance audit policy, public documentation policies, and other specific aspects of their program. IEC 61508 certification programs are being offered globally by several recognized CBs including exida, Intertek, SGS-TÜV Saar, TÜV Nord, TÜV Rheinland, TÜV SÜD and UL.

== Industry/application specific variants ==
=== Automotive ===
ISO 26262 is an adaptation of IEC 61508 for Automotive Electric/Electronic Systems. It is being widely adopted by the major car manufacturers.

Before the launch of ISO 26262, the development of software for safety related automotive systems was predominantly covered by the Motor Industry Software Reliability Association (MISRA) guidelines. The MISRA project was conceived to develop guidelines for the creation of embedded software in road vehicle electronic systems. A set of guidelines for the development of vehicle based software was published in November 1994. This document provided the first automotive industry interpretation of the principles of the, then emerging, IEC 61508 standard.

Today MISRA is most widely known for its guidelines on how to use the C and C++ languages. MISRA C has gone on to become the de facto standard for embedded C programming in the majority of safety-related industries, and is also used to improve software quality even where safety is not the main consideration.

=== Rail ===
IEC 62279 provides a specific interpretation of IEC 61508 for railway applications. It is intended to cover the development of software for railway control and protection including communications, signalling and processing systems. EN 50128 and EN 50657 are equivalent CENELEC standards of IEC 62279.

=== Process industries ===
The process industry sector includes many types of manufacturing processes, such as refineries, petrochemical, chemical, pharmaceutical, pulp and paper, and power. IEC 61511 is a technical standard which sets out practices in the engineering of systems that ensure the safety of an industrial process through the use of instrumentation.

=== Power plants ===
IEC 61513 provides requirements and recommendations for the instrumentation and control for systems important to safety of nuclear power plants. It indicates the general requirements for systems that contain conventional hardwired equipment, computer-based equipment or a combination of both types of equipment. An overview list of safety norms specific for nuclear power plants is published by ISO.

=== Machinery ===
IEC 62061 is the machinery-specific implementation of IEC 61508. It provides requirements that are applicable to the system level design of all types of machinery safety-related electrical control systems and also for the design of non-complex subsystems or devices.

== Testing software ==
Software written in accordance with IEC 61508 may need to be unit tested, depending up on the SIL it needs to achieve. The main requirement in Unit Testing is to ensure that the software is fully tested at the function level and that all possible branches and paths are taken through the software. In some higher SIL level applications, the software code coverage requirement is much tougher and an MC/DC code coverage criterion is used rather than simple branch coverage. To obtain the MC/DC (modified condition/decision coverage) coverage information, one will need a Unit Testing tool, sometimes referred to as a Software Module Testing tool.

== See also ==
- Functional safety
- Safety standards
- FMEDA
- Spurious trip level
- Time-triggered system (A software architecture used to achieve IEC 61508 compliance)
- Software quality
