= LDRA =

Software companies of the United Kingdom

LDRA Limited
- Type: Privately held company
- Industry: Software testing
- Founded: 1975
- Headquarters: Wirral Peninsula, England
- Key people: Professor Michael Hennell, CEO
- Products: LDRA tool suite, TBrun, TBvision, & others
- Website: https://www.ldra.com

LDRA, previously known as the Liverpool Data Research Associates, was a privately held company until acquired by TASKING in 2025. It produced software analysis, testing, and requirements traceability tools for the public and private sectors to perform static and dynamic software analysis.

== History ==
Liverpool Data Research Associates was founded in 1975 by Professor Michael Hennell to commercialize a software test-bed created to perform quality assessments on the mathematical libraries on which his nuclear physics research at the University of Liverpool depended. This research included the invention of the Linear Code Sequence and Jump (LCSAJ) software analysis method.

== Products ==
=== LDRA tool suite ===
LDRA tool suite
- Release: 1975; 51 years ago
- Stable release: v10.2.1 / 27 November 2023; 2 years ago
- Operating system: Windows, Linux, macOS
- Type: Static code analysis, Unit testing, Requirements traceability
- License: Proprietary
- Website: ldra.com/products/ldra-tool-suite/

LDRA tool suite is a proprietary software analysis tool providing static code analysis, and also provides code coverage analysis, code, quality, and design reviews. It is a commercial implementation of the software test-bed created by Hennell as part of his university research.

It is used primarily where software is required to be reliable, rugged, and as error free as possible, such as in safety critical aerospace electronics (or Avionics). It has also been used in the detection and removal of security vulnerabilities.

=== LDRA Testbed ===
LDRA Testbed was a set of core static and dynamic analysis engines for both host and embedded software. LDRA Testbed is made by Liverpool Data Research Associates (LDRA). LDRA Testbed provides the means to enforce compliance with coding standards such as MISRA, JSF++ AV, CERT C, CWE and provides visibility of software flaws that might typically pass through the standard build and test process to become latent problems. In addition, test effectiveness feedback is provided through structural coverage analysis reporting facilities, which support the requirements of the DO-178B standard up to and including Level A.

LDRA Testbed automatically checks adherence to programming standards with static analysis. LDRA Testbed reports violations of the chosen set of standards in both textual reports and as annotations to graphical displays. It includes a dynamic coverage analysis module. LDRA Testbed has a software quality metrics breakdown (e.g. Halstead complexity, cyclomatic complexity, Knots metric) from static analysis.

Some companies using LDRA products include MathWorks, which has integrated its Simulink tools, as well as IBM Rational Rose and Wind River.

=== FAA/EASA verification ===
In March 2012, LDRA announced a fully compliant FAA/EASA certification solution to provide support and guide certification applicants through a wide range of standards including:

- DO-178C(B), DO-278A, DO-254
- IEC 62304
- ISO 26262
- EN 50128
- IEC 60880

== Formula One launch control controversy ==
Following the 1994 San Marino Grand Prix, a Formula One race, the Fédération Internationale de l'Automobile (FIA) hired LDRA to investigate allegations of cheating. These involved driving aids that had been prohibited at the start of the year, such as traction control and launch control. The top three cars of Michael Schumacher (Benetton), Nicola Larini (Ferrari) and Mika Häkkinen (McLaren) were investigated and their teams were asked to surrender their systems' source code to the company. Ferrari complied but Benetton and McLaren refused, citing copyright reasons. After being fined $100,000 by the FIA, both teams complied eight days after the race. LDRA found that McLaren were running a program that permitted automatic gearshifts but the car was declared legal.

The winning Benetton-Ford car was found to have launch control software in its engine management computer, designed to regulate engine speed and prevent wheel spin. Benetton admitted its presence but asserted that it wasn’t used during the race, asserting it was added for testing and left there due to workload pressures. LDRA concluded that the software likely wasn't used during the Grand Prix, leading the FIA to take no action against Benetton or Schumacher.

== Industry standards ==
LDRA is a contributor to several industry standards, including DO-178C, MISRA C and MISRA C++. Additionally, LDRA is an Industry Partner for the CERT C Secure Coding Standard produced by the Computer Emergency Response Team at Carnegie Mellon's Software Engineering Institute.

In September 2012, the United States arm of LDRA joined The Open Group's Future Airborne Capability Environment (FACE) Consortium as a Verification Authority.
