= High Integrity C++ =

Coding standard for safety and reliability

High Integrity C++ (HIC++ or formerly HICPP) is a software coding standard for the C++ programming language developed by Programming Research Limited, now part of Perforce Software. HIC++ was first published in October 2003. The latest revision, version 4.0, was released in October 2013 and documents 155 rules that restrict the use of ISO C++ language to improve software maintenance and reliability in high reliability or safety critical applications.

The Motor Industry Software Reliability Association (MISRA) C++ coding standard reference list includes High Integrity C++ .

== Tools ==
Notable tools that check for compliance with High Integrity C++ are:

- LDRA Testbed by Liverpool Data Research Associates
- Helix QAC (formerly Programming Research Limited QA-C++)
- Parasoft C/C++test by Parasoft

== Revision history ==
- 1.0 – 3 October 2003
- 2.0 – 20 October 2003
- 3.0 – 24 January 2008
- 4.0 – 3 October 2013
