= Dspace =

Dspace may refer to:

- DSpace, a software package for digital repositories
- DSPACE, a complexity measure in computational complexity theory
- dSPACE GmbH, the company dSPACE GmbH (Germany) or its US subsidiary
