= Power of 10 (disambiguation) =

A power of 10 is any of the integer powers of the number ten; in other words, ten multiplied by itself a certain number of times.

Power of 10, Power of ten, or Powers of Ten may refer to:

- Power of 10 (American game show), an American television show about guessing poll results
  - Power of 10 (Australian game show), a television show based on the American show
  - Power of 10 (Philippine game show), a television show based on the American show
  - 10 Ka Dum (lit. 'Power of 10') (India), a television show based on the American show
- Power of Ten (album), by Chris de Burgh
- Powers of Ten (film), a 1968 short documentary film about the relative scale of the Universe, re-released in 1977
- 10 Endrathukulla, a 2015 Indian Tamil-language film by Vijay Milton, released in Hindi as 10 Ka Dum
- Powers of Ten (album), by Shawn Lane
- The Power of 10: Rules for Developing Safety-Critical Code, a set of rules for reliable software
- Powers of Ten, a 2015 album by Stephan Bodzin
- thepowerof10.info, website for UK Athletics rankings and statistics
