= TargetLink =

- Developer(s): dSPACE GmbH
- Stable release: 3.5 (2013)
- Operating system: Windows
- Type: Production Code Generation
- License: Proprietary
- Website: TargetLink

TargetLink is a software for automatic code generation, based on a subset of Simulink/Stateflow models, produced by dSPACE GmbH. TargetLink requires an existing MATLAB/Simulink model to work on. TargetLink generates both ANSI-C and production code optimized for specific processors. It also supports the generation of AUTOSAR-compliant code for software components for the automotive sector. The management of all relevant information for code generation takes place in a central data container, called the Data Dictionary.

Testing of the generated code is implemented in Simulink, which is also used for the specification of the underlying simulation models. TargetLink supports three simulation modes to test the generated code:

- Model-in-the-loop simulation (MIL): this mode allows the model design to be checked. An MIL simulation is also known as a floating-point simulation, since the variables are typically floating-point variables.
- Software-in-the-loop (SIL): the simulation is based on the execution of generated code, which runs on a PC system. The variables are typically plain or fixed point numbers.
- Processor-in-the-loop (PIL): in a PIL simulation, the generated code runs on the target hardware or on an evaluation board. So-called real-time frames are included, making it possible to transfer the simulation results as well as memory consumption and runtime information to the PC.

The Motor Industry Software Reliability Association (MISRA) published official MISRA modeling guidelines for TargetLink in late 2007, which are particularly important for functional safety of safety-critical applications. In 2009, TÜV SÜD certified TargetLink for use during the development of safety-critical systems to ISO DIS 26262 and IEC 61508.

== Sources ==
- Overview of Embedded System Design Education at Berkeley
- MISRA Autocode Forum - Real-life experience of using a modelling subset for TargetLink in safety-related work
- Working with TargetLink Models in Reactis
