= Vilkomir (disambiguation) =

Vilkomir (a.k.a. Ukmergė) is a city in Vilnius County, Lithuania Vilkomir may also refer to:

- Battle of Vilkomir (1435, a.k.a. Battle of Wilkomierz)
- Sergiy Vilkomir (1957–2020), Ukrainian computer scientist
