= TASKING =

TASKING GmbH
- Industry: Software development
- Founded: 1977
- Headquarters: Munich, Germany
- Area served: Worldwide
- Products: Compilers, debuggers, test tools
- Website: http://www.tasking.com

TASKING GmbH is a German company that provides embedded software development tools and is headquartered in Munich, Germany.

== History ==
Founded as a software consulting company in 1977, TASKING developed its first C compiler in 1986. In 1988, its first embedded toolset for the 8051 family of single-chip microcontrollers was launched. The company merged with Boston System Office (BSO) in 1989 and shortly later developed a second-generation compiler designed to support the C166 and DSP56K.

In 1998, TASKING partnered with Infineon Technologies to develop the first TriCore development software. Altium acquired TASKING in 2001, and began working on its third-generation compiler technology, the Viper compiler. This compiler was designed to increase the speed and code efficiency of the TriCore development toolset.

The C166 toolset was upgraded to third-generation compiler technology in 2006. In 2014, a compiler for the Renesas RH850 family and an Automotive Safety Support Program (Safety Kit) for ISO 26262 certification were introduced. The TASKING TriCore toolset received an update in 2015 and another update in 2017. These are optimization updates, though the focus was on additional support for the Infineon AURIX and Infineon AURIX 2G multi-core processors.

In 2016, the Safety Checker product was released. Safety Checker provides static code analysis to verify that no unauthorized access to protected memory occurs. In 2017, the VX Toolset for TriCore v6.2 with a stand-alone embedded debugger was released.

In 2022 TASKING acquired iSYSTEM, a company focusing on high-end debugging, tracing and timing analysis tools. Three years later, in 2025 it continued its portfolio expansion by acquiring LDRA, a software company focusing on software analysis, testing and requirements traceability tools.

== Products ==
TASKING provides embedded software development tools for the following processors and others:

- Infineon TriCore/AURIX
- Infineon/ST Micro C166/ST10
- Freescale Qorivva
- STMicroelectronics SPC 5
- Renesas RH850
- Bosch GTM-IP MCS (generic timer module)
- 8051

The VX Toolset contains a set of tools for developing and troubleshooting software for the TriCore, AURIX, and AURIX 2G processors from Infineon Technologies. This package includes C/C++ compilers for the TriCore, C compilers for the Generic Timer Module (GTM), Hardware Safety Module (HSM), 8051 (SCR), and Peripheral Co-Processor (PCP). Additional tools include a pin mapper, debugger, linker, and assemblers.

Non-compiler tools:

- Safety Kit – an ISO 26262 qualification program that inspects software and its intended application
- Safety Checker – automatically detects interference between software elements with different Automotive Safety Integrity Level (ASIL) by checking access restrictions on the memory of single- and multi-core systems
- Stand-alone Embedded Debugger

== See also ==
- List of EDA companies
- Electronics
- Electronic engineering
- FPGAs
- Embedded systems
