= Michael Hennell =

British computer scientist (born 1940)

Professor Michael A. Hennell (born 9 September 1940) is a British computer scientist who has made leading contributions in the field of software testing.

Michael Hennell was a Professor of Mathematical Sciences, University of Liverpool in England.

As part of his leading role in software testing, Hennell was a member of the editorial board of the journal Software Testing, Verification and Reliability (STVR), a major international journal in the field of software testing.

Hennell's academic research was initially conducted in Nuclear physics, resulting in the use of Computational science for addressing complex nuclear mathematics. Assessing the quality of the mathematical libraries on which this work depended lead Professor Hennell into the world of Software testing, specifically in the use of Static code analysis for quantifying the effectiveness of test data, which led to the development of the Linear Code Sequence and Jump concept.

In 1975 Professor Hennell founded Liverpool Data Research Associates Ltd. (LDRA) to commercialize the software test-bed designed to analyse numerical software.
