= NCover =

Code coverage tool for .NET

Established 2003
Creator Peter Waldschmidt
Location Greenville, SC
Description Code Coverage Software
Website http://www.ncover.com

NCover is a .NET code coverage tool. There are two non-related NCover products that do .NET code coverage. There is an open source NCover that can be found on SourceForge and there is a company called NCover, LLC. There has been additional development on both products since this 2004 reference.

The company NCover, LLC began when the founder, Peter Waldschmidt, decided to commercialize the open source tool he created. The commercial versions were launched in 2007, but the last supported free version 1.5.8 is still available on the company site.
