= Decision-to-decision path =

Path of execution between decisions

A decision-to-decision path, or DD-path, is a path of execution (usually through a flow graph representing a program, such as a flow chart) between two decisions. More recent versions of the concept also include the decisions themselves in their own DD-paths.

A flow graph of a program. Each color denotes a different DD-path. Nodes 1,2,5 and 6 are each in their own DD-path containing a single node. Nodes 3 and 4 together form one DD-path (they are a maximal chain).

== Definition ==
In Huang's 1975 paper, a decision-to-decision path is defined as path in a program's flowchart such that all the following hold (quoting from the paper):

- its first constituent edge emanates either from an entry node or a decision box;
- its last constituent edge terminates either at a decision box or at an exit node; and
- there are no decision boxes on the path except those at both ends

Jorgensen's more recent textbooks restate it in terms of a program's flow graph (called a "program graph" in that textbook). First define some preliminary notions: chain and a maximal chain. A chain is defined as a path in which:

- initial and terminal nodes are distinct, and
- all interior nodes have in-degree = 1 and out-degree = 1.

A maximal chain is a chain that is not part of a bigger chain.

A DD-path is a set of nodes in a program graph such that one of the following holds (quoting and keeping Jorgensen's numbering, with comments added in parentheses):

1. It consists of a single node with in-degree = 0 (initial node)
2. It consists of a single node with out-degree = 0 (terminal node)
3. It consists of a single node with in-degree ≥ 2 or out-degree ≥ 2 (decision/merge points)
4. It consists of a single node with in-degree = 1 and out-degree = 1
5. It is a maximal chain of length ≥ 1.

According to Jorgensen (2013), in Great Britain and ISTQB literature, the same notion is called linear code sequence and jump (LCSAJ).

== Properties ==
From the latter definition (of Jorgensen) we can conclude the following:

- Every node on a flow graph of a program belongs to one DD-path.
- If the first node on a DD-path is traversed, then all other nodes on that path will also be traversed.
- The DD path graph is used to find independent path for testing.
- Every statement in the program has been executed at least once.

== DD-path testing ==
According to Jorgensen's 2013 textbook, DD-path testing is the best known code-based testing method, incorporated in numerous commercial tools.

DD-path testing is also called C2 testing or branch coverage.

== See also ==
- Basic block
- Basis path testing and its ancillary articles
  - Cyclomatic complexity
  - Essential complexity
- Code coverage
- White-box testing
