= Sergiy Vilkomir =

Ukrainian-born computer scientist (1956–2020)

Sergiy A. Vilkomir
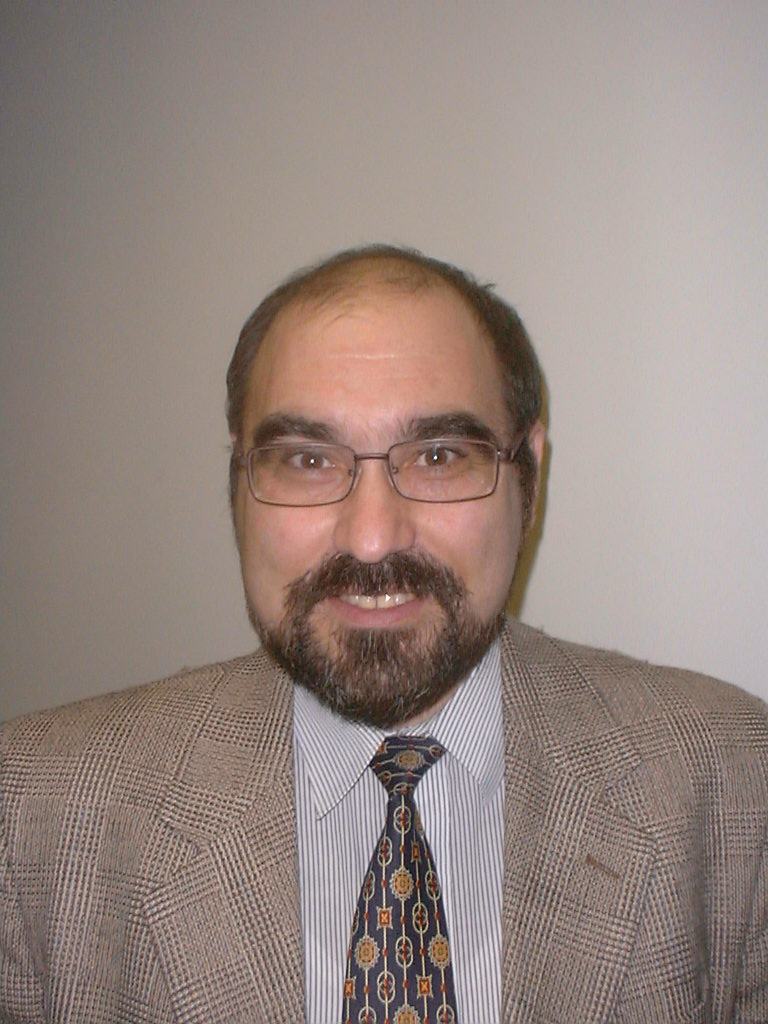
- Sergiy Vilkomir in 2001
- Born: Сергій Адольфович Вілкомір; 19 November 1956; Kramatorsk, Stalino Oblast, Ukrainian SSR
- Died: 9 February 2020 (aged 63); North Carolina, United States
- Citizenship: United States
- Education: Kharkov State University, Kharkov Polytechnic Institute
- Known for: Software testing, formal methods, RC/DC
- Awards: Google Faculty Research Award (2010–11); East Carolina University Scholar-Teacher Award (2015); UNC Board of Governors Distinguished Professor of Teaching Award (2017).
- Scientific career
- Fields: Computer science
- Workplaces: London South Bank University, University of Wollongong, University of Limerick, University of Tennessee, East Carolina University

Sergiy A. Vilkomir (Ukrainian: Сергій Адольфович Вілкомір; 19 November 1956 – 9 February 2020) was a Ukrainian-born computer scientist.

Sergiy Vilkomir was born in 1956 in present-day Ukraine. He finished Mathematical College at the Moscow State University National Mathematical Boarding High School no. 18 (Head-Academician A. Kolmogorov, 1972–74), studied for an MSc degree in Mathematics and Mathematics Education at Kharkov State University (1974–79), and for a PhD degree at Kharkov Polytechnic Institute (1985–90). In Kharkiv, Ukraine, he then worked at the Ukrainian Polytechnic Institute (1979–82), the Central Institute of Complex Automation (1985–91), the Institute of Safety and Reliability of Technological Systems (1992–93), the Ukrainian State Scientific and Technical Centre on Nuclear and Radiation Safety (part of the Nuclear Safety Regulatory Authority of Ukraine, 1993–2000). His role included licensing and audits of computer-based safety systems at nuclear power plants.

In 2000, Vilkomir moved to the Centre for Applied Formal Methods at London South Bank University, becoming a Research Fellow there. He then joined the University of Wollongong in Australia, also as a Research Fellow. He subsequently worked with David Parnas at the University of Limerick in Ireland, before moving to the United States, initially as Research Associate Professor and the University of Tennessee during 2007–8, then rising to be an associate professor position at East Carolina University, which he joined in 2008. There he achieved academic tenure in 2012 and was Head of the Software Testing Research Group (STRG).

Vilkomir's main research contributions have been in the formalization of software testing. In particular, he proposed reinforced condition/decision coverage (RC/DC), a stronger version of the modified condition/decision coverage (MC/DC) coverage criterion for software testing in safety-critical systems.

Vilkomir was awarded the Google Faculty Research Award for 2010–11, the East Carolina University Scholar-Teacher Award in 2015, and the UNC Board of Governors Distinguished Professor of Teaching Award in 2017. He was a Senior Member of both the Association for Computing Machinery (ACM, from 2013), and the IEEE.

Sergiy Vilkomir died on 9 February 2020. He was married to Tetyana Vilkomir.

== Selected publications ==
- Vilkomir, S.A.; Bowen, J.P. (2001). "Formalization of software testing criteria using the Z notation". 25th Annual International Computer Software and Applications Conference. COMPSAC 2001. IEEE. pp. 351–356. doi:10.1109/CMPSAC.2001.960638. ISBN 0-7695-1372-7. S2CID 1224201.
- Vilkomir, S.A.; Bowen, J.P. (2002). "Reinforced condition/decision coverage (RC/DC): A new criterion for software testing". International Conference of B and Z Users. Lecture Notes in Computer Science. Vol. 2272. Springer-Verlag. pp. 291–308. doi:10.1007/3-540-45648-1_15. ISBN 978-3-540-43166-4.
- Vilkomir, S.A.; Kapoor, K.; Bowen, J.P. (2003). "Tolerance of control-flow testing criteria". Proceedings 27th Annual International Computer Software and Applications Conference. COMPAC 2003. IEEE. pp. 182–187. doi:10.1109/CMPSAC.2003.1245339. ISBN 0-7695-2020-0. S2CID 178608.
- Baber, R.L.; Parnas, D.L.; Vilkomir, S.A.; Harrison, P.; O'Connor, T. (2005). "Disciplined methods of software specification: A case study". International Conference on Information Technology: Coding and Computing (ITCC'05) - Volume II. Vol. II. IEEE. pp. 428–437 Vol. 2. doi:10.1109/ITCC.2005.132. ISBN 0-7695-2315-3. S2CID 17982307.
- Vilkomir, S.A.; Bowen, J.P. (2006). "From MC/DC to RC/DC: formalization and analysis of control-flow testing criteria". Formal Aspects of Computing. 18 (1). Springer Nature: 42–62. doi:10.1007/s00165-005-0084-7. S2CID 10467796.
- Hierons, R.M.; Bogdanov, K.; Bowen, J.P.; Cleaveland, R.; Derrick, J.; Dick, J.; Gheorghe, M.; Harman, M.; Kapoor, K.; Krause, P.; Lüttgen, G.; Simons, A.J.H.; Vilkomir, S.A.; Woodward, M.R.; Zedan, H. (2009). "Using formal specifications to support testing". ACM Computing Surveys. 41 (2). Association for Computing Machinery: 1–76. doi:10.1145/1459352.1459354. S2CID 10686134.
