= DSPACE (company) =

German electronics and software company

dSPACE SE & Co. KG
- Type: SE & Co KG (SE & Co KG)
- Industry: Automotive, aerospace, agriculture, energy, rail, academia
- Founded: 1988
- Founder: Herbert Hanselmann
- Headquarters: Paderborn
- Key people: Carsten Hoff
- Revenue: € 460 million (2024)
- Number of employees: 2900 (2025)
- Website: www.dspace.com

dSPACE (digital signal processing and control engineering) is a German company that develops tools and solutions for the development and testing of electronic systems. It has about 3,000 employees and has offices in Paderborn, Germany, four project centers in Germany, and other offices in the United States, the UK, France, Japan, China, Croatia, South Korea, India, Sweden, and Italy.

== Application fields ==
dSPACE products are primarily used by automotive manufacturers and their suppliers to test the software and hardware components of their new vehicles. In addition to vehicle development, the company’s technologies are also applied in other fields, including aerospace, agriculture, energy, railway, and industrial automation. The portfolio ranges from end-to-end simulation and validation solutions to engineering and consulting services, training, and support.

=== Control design ===
The control design phase involves developing the control algorithms for electronic control units (ECU), usually by modeling them graphically. This process can be performed with Simulink, modeling software from MathWorks, and is outside dSPACE's application fields.

=== Rapid control prototyping (RCP) ===
In rapid control prototyping, control algorithms are taken from a mathematical model and implemented as a real-time application so that the control strategies can be tested on the actual system under control, such as a car or a robot. Simulink is used as the input and simulation tool, and Simulink Coder, also from MathWorks, is used as the code generator. dSPACE provides the necessary hardware platform consisting of a processor and interfaces for sensors and actuators, as well as the software needed to integrate the interfaces into the Simulink model and to perform tests.

=== Production code generation / ECU autocoding ===
In a development process based on mathematical models, the models are designed using graphical software, and automatic production code generators are then used to translate the models directly into code for ECUs/controllers. Once a model's behavior has been validated, the code generator has to reliably transfer it to the target processor, whose resources are usually designed for the greatest possible cost-efficiency. In other words, the final production ECU generally has less memory and processing power than the RCP system on which the algorithm was developed and tested. As a result, the C code (production code) generated for the target processor has to meet stringent requirements regarding execution time and efficiency. In 1999, dSPACE introduced the production code generator TargetLink, which is integrated into Simulink, the environment for model-based development. In addition to performing the actual autocoding, including code generation for AUTOSAR software components, TargetLink also makes it possible for developers to compare the behavior of the generated code with that of the original Simulink model (by means of software-in-the-loop (SIL) and processor-in-the-loop (PIL) simulation).

=== Software-in-the-loop (SIL) testing ===
In SIL simulation, developers can verify and validate software components of electronic control units (ECU) and control systems in a fully virtual environment. Instead of relying on physical hardware, the software is executed and tested on a standard computer system. In a SIL setup, virtual representations of ECUs (often referred to as virtual ECUs or V-ECUs), communication networks, and the surrounding system environment are simulated. This allows developers to test functions, complete control software, or even complex multi-ECU systems early in the development process.

=== Hardware-in-the-Loop (HIL)-Simulation ===
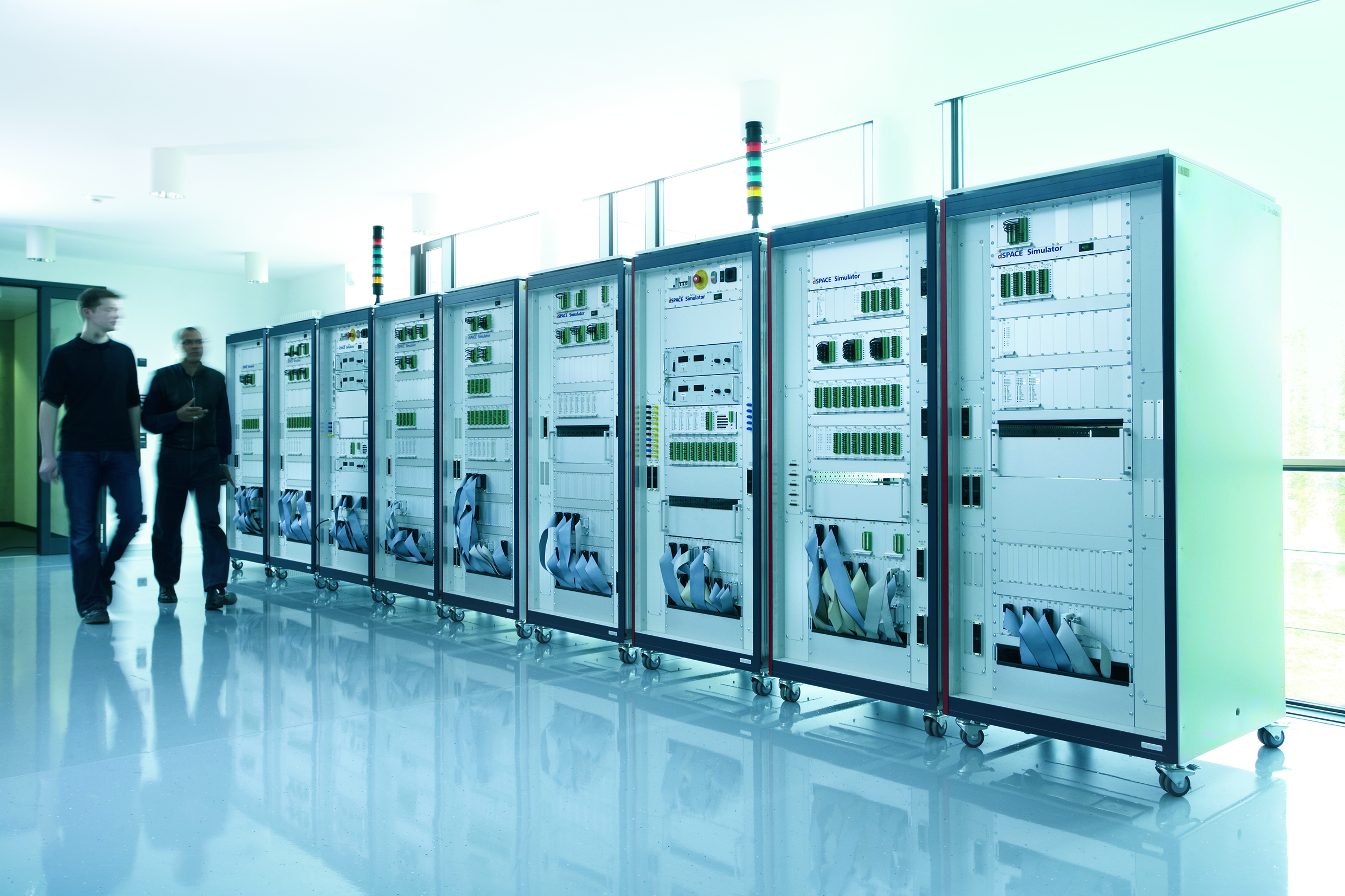
Simulation hardware

In HIL simulation, a simulator mimics the environment in which an ECU operates, such as a car, an airplane, a robot, etc. First, the ECU inputs and outputs are connected to the simulator's inputs and outputs. In the next step, the simulator executes a real-time model of the ECU's working environment, which can consist of dSPACE Automotive Simulation Models (ASM) or of models from other vendors. This method provides a way to test new functions reproducibly in a safe environment before a prototype of the product has been produced. As with rapid control prototyping, Simulink models are the foundation. An advantage of HIL simulation compared to ECU tests in real prototype vehicles is that tests on the control unit can be performed already during the development process. This enables testing at an early stage of the development process, before physical prototypes of the system are available.

=== Calibration / parameterization ===
Optimizing control functions so that they fit specific applications is an integral part of ECU and controller development. To achieve this, the parameters of the ECUs are adjusted during ECU calibration. dSPACE offers software and hardware for this purpose.

=== Data-driven development ===
Data-driven development is a software engineering approach in which the development, training, and validation of system functions are primarily guided by data rather than solely by predefined algorithms or specifications. In the context of advanced driver-assistance systems (ADAS) and automated driving, large volumes of sensor and vehicle data, acquired from real-world operation or generated synthetically, are used to model and refine system behavior. dSPACE provides tools that support the use, processing, and validation of such data in development workflows.

The process typically follows an iterative cycle in which data are collected, curated, and used for model training; the resulting system is subsequently tested and validated, for example, in simulation or replay environments. Scenarios identified during testing, particularly rare or safety-critical cases, are fed back into the data pool. This continuous feedback loop supports systematic performance improvement and increases coverage of relevant operating conditions.

=== Artificial intelligence (AI) ===
Artificial intelligence methods are used in the development of technical systems, for example, in perception and decision-making functions. dSPACE develops tools that support the integration, testing, and validation of AI-based components in development workflows.

== Company history ==
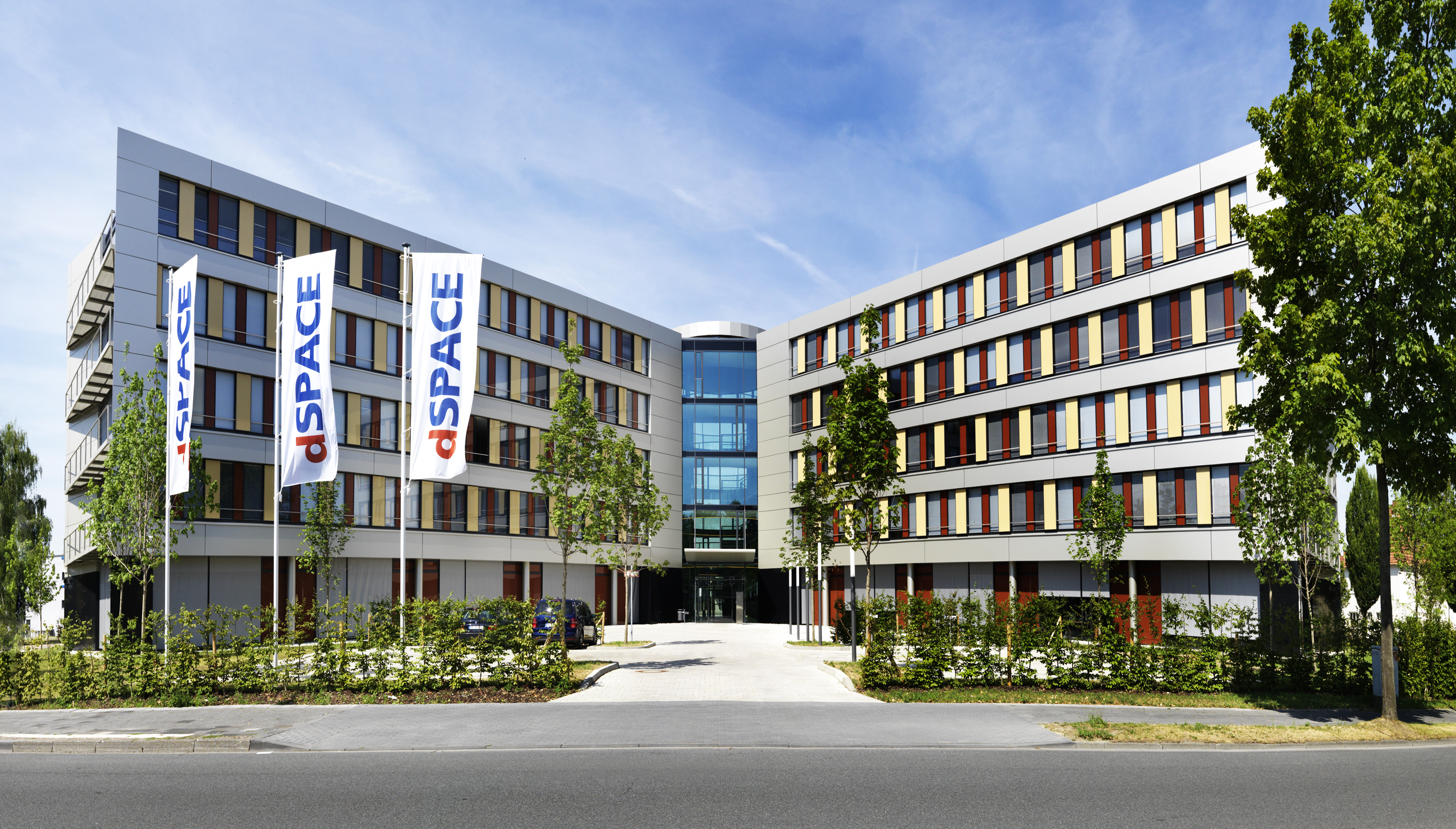
New dSPACE building in Paderborn

- 1988: dSPACE is founded by Herbert Hanselmann and three other research associates at the Institute of Mechatronics at the University of Paderborn, Germany.
- 1991: First local dSPACE company outside Germany opens (dSPACE Inc.) Initially outside Detroit USA in Southfield, Michigan, relocated to Wixom in 2007.
- 2001: Local dSPACE companies are opened in France (dSPACE SARL, Paris) and the UK (dSPACE Ltd., Melbourn near Cambridge); and a second Project Center is opened (Project Centre Warwick).
- 2006: The local dSPACE company in Japan is opened (dSPACE K.K.). Initially in Yokohama, relocated to Tokyo in 2007.
- 2008: The company's 20th anniversary. The local dSPACE company in China (dSPACE Mechatronic Control Technology (Shanghai) Co., Ltd.) is founded, and Herbert Hanselmann receives the "Entrepreneur Of The Year 2008" award
- 2010: dSPACE GmbH relocates to the new campus in Paderborn, Germany.
- 2018: The local dSPACE company in Croatia is opened (dSPACE Engineering d.o.o.) in Zagreb.
- 2021: The local dSPACE company in South Korea is opened (dSPACE Korea Co. Ltd.) in Seoul.
- 2023: The local dSPACE company in India is opened (dSPACE India Solutions Pvt. Ltd.) in Bangalore.
- 2026: The dSPACE company in Italy is opened.

== History of dSPACE products ==
- 1988: First real-time development system for control technology/mechatronics, based on a digital signal processor
- 1989: First hardware-in-the-loop (HIL) simulator is shipped
- 1990: First real-time development system with a floating-point processor is shipped
- 1992: RTI, first real-time system connected to MATLAB/Simulink
- 1994: First multiprocessor hardware for real-time development systems
- 1995: First turnkey (HIL) simulator for an ABS/ESP test bench
- 1999: MicroAutoBox, a complete prototyping system for in-vehicle use
- 1999: TargetLink, the first production code generator for ECUs based on MATLAB/Simulink
- 2003: CalDesk, a component of the dSPACE calibration system
- 2005: RapidPro, a modular system for signal conditioning and power stages
- 2005: Automotive Simulation Models (ASMs), real-time automotive simulation models based on MATLAB/Simulink
- 2007: SystemDesk, tool for developing complex ECU software architectures based on the AUTOSAR concept
- 2010: MicroAutoBox II, second generation of the vehicle-capable prototyping systems
- 2011: SCALEXIO, the new hardware-in-the-loop system, including new ConfigurationDesk configuration software
- 2012: VEOS, PC-based simulation platform for early validation of ECU software
- 2015: MicroLabBox: Compact prototyping unit for the laboratory
- 2020: dSPACE acquires Intempora, main product: Intempora Validation Suite (IVS), a sensor data management platform
