= Certification Authorities Software Team =

- Abbreviation: CAST
- Formation: 1990
- Products: CAST Position Papers
- Fields: Certification of airborne software and hardware
- No meetings since 2016.

The Certification Authorities Software Team (CAST) is an international group of aviation certification and regulatory authority representatives. The organization of has been a means of coordination among representatives from certification authorities in North and South America, Europe, and Asia, in particular, the FAA and EASA. The focus of the organization has been harmonization of Certification Authorities activities in part though clarification and improvement of the guidance provided by DO-178C and DO-254.

== Activities ==
Since 1982, RTCA publication DO-178 has provided guidance on certification aspects of safety-critical software use in civil aircraft. In 1985, the first revision DO-178A was issued. The CAST organization first met November 1990 to develop consistent international certification authority input to the drafting of the next revision, DO-178B, which was released in 1992. In 2003, the organization expanded its scope to address the published certification guidance for airborne electronic hardware provided in the RTCA publication DO-254 released in 2000.

With application of DO-178B, it was discovered that many projects were not complying with DO-178B, but there was also wide variations in how various certification authorities conducted project assessments. In response, the CAST developed a standard software compliance assessment approach. In a manner similar to standard staged engineering design review practices (e.g., 10%-50%-90%-100% Complete), this introduced four standard milestones in a software development project where an FAA authority or representative would assess the applicant's progress towards compliance. A goal was to detect issues in time to for the applicant to make adjustments to maximize successful accomplishment of all certification objectives. The FAA further developed this approach in the "Mega" FAA Order 8110.49 Chapter 2, defining the four Stages of Involvement (SOI) Audits as Planning, Development, Verification (Test), and Final.

From 1998 on, the CAST provided informational recommendations in the form of a series of position papers that were neither policy nor guidance documents. These position papers were among the inputs to the joint RTCA/EUROCAE committee that developed DO-178C, DO-278A, DO-248C, and DO-330, and the technology supplements to these publications (DO-331, DO-332, and DO-333).

The model for international certification authority harmonization has changed since CAST's inception. Certification Management Team Collaboration Strategy now emphasizes direct collaboration with industry on technical topics. CAST has not met since October 2016 and the FAA has removed links to past CAST position papers from its website; Position Papers 1-26 were archived in 2015 and this archive was removed in 2017. All but one remaining position papers were later removed from the website and the link to the remaining CAST-32A will be removed after publication of AC 20-193.

Even though these legacy items have been removed, not all information they contain has been included in replacement publications, so, they remain a source of insight into present guidance.

== Position Papers ==
Series	Subject	Year
CAST-1	Guidance for Assessing the Software Aspects of Product Service History of Airborne Systems and Equipment	1998
CAST-2	Guidelines for Assessing Software Partitioning/Protection Schemes	2001
CAST-3	Guidelines for Assuring the Software Aspects of Certification When Replacing Obsolete Electronic Parts Used in Airborne Systems and Equipment	1999
CAST-4	Object-Oriented Technology (OOT) in Civil Aviation Projects: Certification Concerns; Status: Cancelled	2000
CAST-5	Guidelines for Proposing Alternate Means of Compliance to DO-178B	2000
CAST-6	Rationale for Accepting Masking MC/DC in Certification Projects	2001
CAST-7	Open Problem Report (OPR) Management for Certification	2001
CAST-8	Use of the C++ Programming Language	2002
CAST-9	Considerations for Evaluating Safety Engineering Approaches to Software Assurance	2002
CAST-10	What is a "Decision" in Application of Modified Condition/Decision Coverage (MC/DC) and Decision Coverage (DC)?	2002
CAST-11	Criteria for Assuring Complete Software Verification Processes; Status: Superseded by CAST 11A	2002
CAST-11A	Criteria for Assuring Continuous and Complete Software Verification Processes	2007
CAST-12	Guidelines for Approving Source Code to Object Code Traceability	2002
CAST-13	Automatic Code Generation Tools Development Assurance	2002
CAST-14	Use of a Level D Commercial Off-the-Shelf Operating System in Systems with Other Software of Levels C and/or D Status: Cancelled	2002
CAST-15	Merging High-Level and Low-Level Requirements	2003
CAST-16	Databus Evaluation Criteria	2003
CAST-17	Structural Coverage of Object Code	2003
CAST-18	Reverse Engineering in Certification Projects	2003
CAST-19	Clarification of Structural Coverage Analyses of Data Coupling and Control Coupling	2004
CAST-20	Addressing Cache in Airborne Systems and Equipment	2003
CAST-21	Compiler-Supplied Libraries	2004
CAST-22	Reuse of Software Tool Qualification Data Across Company Boundaries (Applying the Reusable Software Component Concept to Tools)	2005
CAST-23	Software Part Numbering	2005
CAST-24	Reliance on Development Assurance Alone when Performing a Complex and Full-Time Critical Function	2006
CAST-25	Considerations When Using a Qualifiable Development Environment (QDE) in Certification Projects	2005
CAST-26	Verification Independence	2006
CAST-27	Clarifications on the use of RTCA Document DO-254 and EUROCAE Document ED-80, Design Assurance Guidance for Airborne Electronic Hardware	2006
CAST-28	Frequently Asked Questions (FAQs) on the use of RTCA Document DO-254 and EUROCAE Document ED-80, Design Assurance Guidance for Airborne Electronic Hardware	2006
CAST-29	Use of COTS Graphical Processors (CGP) in Airborne Display Systems	2007
CAST-30	Simple Electronic Hardware and RTCA Document DO-254 and EUROCAE Document ED-80, Design Assurance Guidance for Airborne Electronic Hardware	2007
CAST-31	Technical Clarifications Identified for RTCA DO-254 / EUROCAE ED-80	2012
CAST-32	Multi-core Processors; Status: Superseded by CAST 32A	2014
CAST-32A	Multi-core Processors	2016
CAST-33	Compliance to RTCA DO-254/ EUROCAE ED-80, "Design Assurance Guidance for Airborne Electronic Hardware", for COTS Intellectual Property Used in Programmable Logic Devices and Application Specific Integrated Circuits	2014
