= AC 20-152 =

Development Assurance for Airborne Electronic Hardware
- FAA Publication
- Abbreviation: AC 20-152
- Year started: 2005
- Latest version: A 2022
- Organization: Federal Aviation Administration
- Domain: Aviation safety
- Website: FAA

The Advisory Circular AC 20-152A, Development Assurance for Airborne Electronic Hardware, identifies the RTCA-published standard DO-254 as defining "an acceptable means, but not the only means" to secure FAA approval of electronic hardware for use within the airspace subject to FAA authority. With the 2022 release of Revision A (effectively a complete rewrite and remarkable expansion) this Advisory Circular becomes a very important instrument for completing and updating some DO-245 guidance and providing applicants with clarifications and additional information on that standard. Revision A was developed and released as "a stop-gap measure" until DO-254A can be released to address rapidly increasing complexity of COTs hardware and to make explicit the greatly reduced assurance effort needed for simple hardware and DAL D hardware. This revision replaces AC 20-152, CAST-27, and EASA CM SWCEH-001.

Initially, the DO-254 was commonly interpreted as applying only to complex custom micro-coded components within aircraft systems with Item Design Assurance Levels (IDAL) of A, B, or C. However, DO-254 guidance on simple electronic hardware and other topics needed some clarification. In 2022, Revision A of this AC clarified that AC 20-152() and DO-254 apply to the type certification of all electronic hardware aspects of airborne systems, including all simple electronic hardware at greatly reduced effort.

Revision A also defines 29 objectives additional to those identified in DO-254. Applicants choosing to follow DO-254 under the authority of AC 20-152A must also accomplish all of these additional objectives that apply to their particular hardware.

Specifically excluding COTS microcontrollers (see AC 20-115()/DO-178C), this advisory addresses complex custom micro-coded components include field programmable gate arrays (FPGA), programmable logic devices (PLD), and application-specific integrated circuits (ASIC), particularly in cases where correctness and safety cannot be verified through testing alone, necessitating methodical design assurance processes such as those defined in DO-254 for DAL A through DAL C. Simple devices are those that are verifiable with testing alone, such that the FAA may agree that methodical design assurance is unnecessary.

Relief for DAL D

For DAL D hardware, as long as the applicant follows DO-254, the applicant does not need to apply this advisory circular since the FAA does not expect to examine the life cycle data. However, if the applicant chooses to follow alternative design practices for DAL D hardware (as permitted by this AC) the FAA will review the data.

Application to circuit board assemblies

One new objective in AC 20-152A explicitly states DO-254's application to circuit board assemblies (CBA) that contribute to hardware DAL A, DAL B, or DAL C functions.

Relationship to FAA Order 8110.105

With the release of the expanded AC 20-152A and its companion AC 00-72, Best Practices for Airborne Electronic Hardware Design Assurance Using EUROCAE ED-80() and RTCA DO-254(), chapters 3 through 6 of FAA Order 8110.105A were removed in a Revision B released in 2024 to eliminate any duplication or conflict with the new ACs. The removed sections had been published as an expedient solution to the concerns of both authorities and applicants. These were removed because the FAA now avoids using internal FAA Orders and Notices to provide guidance and clarifications to applicants. Where this pair of new ACs replace material in Order 8110.105, AC 20-152A provides new guidance to close gaps in DO-254 while AC 00-72 provides "additional information" on some of the new objectives in AC 20-152A.

== Revision history ==
Revision History of AC 20-152
Revision	Year	Title
AC 20-152	30 Jun 2005	Design Assurance Guidance for Airborne Electronic Hardware
AC 20-152A	07 Oct 2022	Development Assurance for Airborne Electronic Hardware
