= Advisory circular =

Publication offered by the Federal Aviation Administration

- FAA Publication
- Abbreviation: AC
- Organization: Federal Aviation Administration
- Domain: Aviation safety
- Website: FAA Advisory Circulars (ACs)

Advisory circular (AC) refers to a type of publication offered by the Federal Aviation Administration (FAA) to "provide a single, uniform, agency-wide system … to deliver advisory (non-regulatory) material to the aviation community." Advisory circulars are now harmonized with soft law Acceptable Means of Compliance (AMC) publications of EASA, which are nearly identical in content. The FAA's Advisory Circular System is defined in FAA Order 1320.46D.

By writing advisory circulars, the FAA can provide guidance for compliance with airworthiness regulations, pilot certifications, operational standards, training standards, and any other rules within the 14 CFR Aeronautics and Space title, aka 14 CRF or FARs. The FAA also uses advisory circulars to officially recognize "acceptable means, but not the only means," of accomplishing or showing compliance with airworthiness regulations. Advisory circulars may also contain explanations, clarifications, best practices, or other information of use to the aviation community.

== Usage ==
Advisory circulars can recognize industry standards from SAE (ARP), RTCA (DO), and others. With harmonization of technical content and guidance between EASA and the FAA, later advisory circulars also identify corresponding EUROCAE (ED) publications.

Some advisory circulars are only a few pages long and do little more than reference a recommended standard; for example, AC 20-152 referencing DO-254. Others, like AC 20-115C/D, are considerably longer; in this case including guidance on how to transition from DO-178 revision B to C while AC 20-152A adds several new objectives to an otherwise unchanged DO-254.

== Relation to regulations ==
Generally informative in nature, Advisory Circulars are neither binding nor regulatory; yet some have the effect of de facto standards or regulations. The FAA establishes regulation of U.S. civil airspace through issuance of Federal Aviation Regulations (FAR). Issuing or amending FARs requires a potentially lengthy period of public commentary and agency reflection on proposed rule making before they may be issued for enforcement. In practice, advisory circulars have essential roles for public compliance with the regulations. The FAA relies on the advisory circular system to

- "Provide an acceptable, clearly understood method for complying with a regulation"
- "Standardize implementation of a regulation or harmonize implementation for the international aviation community"
- "Resolve a general misunderstanding of a regulation"
- "Help the industry and FAA effectively implement a regulation"

In contrast with the lengthy processes of FARs, advisory circulars may be published with little or no advanced notice or distribution. A concern is that the content of advisory circulars should not have the effect of de facto amendments to regulations. In general, the FAA may not "use an AC to add, reduce, or change a regulatory requirement."

Examples of Published Advisory Circulars
Advisory Circular	Title	Referenced Standards
AC 00-69	Best Practices for Airborne Software Development Assurance Using EUROCAE ED-12( ) and RTCA DO-178( )	
AC 00-71	Best Practices for Management of Open Problem Reports (OPRs)	
AC 00-72	Best Practices for Airborne Electronic Hardware Design Assurance Using EUROCAE ED-80( ) and RTCA DO-254( )	
AC 20-115	Airborne Software Development Assurance Using EUROCAE ED-12( ) and RTCA DO-178( )	ED-12C/DO-178C; ED-215/DO-330; ED-218/DO-331; ED-217/DO-332; ED-216/DO-333
AC 20-136	Aircraft Electrical and Electronic System Lightning Protection	RTCA DO-160 §22
AC 20-148	Reusable Software Components	
AC 20-152A	Design Assurance Guidance for Airborne Electronic Hardware	RTCA DO-254
AC 20-170	Integrated Modular Avionics Development. Verification, Integration and Approval	RTCA DO-297
AC 20-189	Management of Open Problem Reports (OPRs)	
AC 20-1317	The Certification of Aircraft Electrical and Electronic Systems for Operation in the High Radiated Fields (HIRF) Environment	
AC 25.1309-1	System Design and Analysis	ARP4754, ARP4761
AC 20-174	Development of Civil Aircraft and Systems	ARP4754A
AC 43.13-1B	Acceptable Methods, Techniques, and Practices - Aircraft Inspection and Repair	
AC 70-1	Outdoor Laser Operations	
AC 91-57B	Exception for Limited Recreational Operations of Unmanned Aircraft (relevant to Regulation of UAVs in the United States)	
AC 107-2	Small Unmanned Aircraft Systems (sUAS) (contains 14 CFR part 107 guidance).	49 U.S.C. § 44809

== See also ==
- Airworthiness Directive (in comparison, airworthiness directives are legally enforceable rules)
