= ARP4754 =

Aerospace Practice

Guidelines For Development Of Civil Aircraft and Systems
- Abbreviation: ARP4754
- Year started: 1996
- Latest version: B December 2023
- Organization: SAE International
- Domain: Aviation Safety
- Website: www.sae.org/standards/content/arp4754b/

ARP4754(), Aerospace Recommended Practice (ARP) Guidelines for Development of Civil Aircraft and Systems, is a published standard from SAE International, dealing with the development processes which support certification of Aircraft systems, addressing "the complete aircraft development cycle, from systems requirements through systems verification." Since their joint release in 2002, compliance with the guidelines and methods described within ARP4754() and its companion ARP4761() have become mandatory for effectively all civil aviation world-wide.

Revision A was released in December 2010. It was recognized by the FAA through Advisory Circular AC 20-174 published November 2011. EUROCAE jointly issued the document as ED–79.

Revision B was released in December 2023 and inherits the "mandates" conferred through FAA advisory circulars AC 25.1309-1 and AC 20-174 as acceptable means of demonstrating compliance with 14 CFR 25.1309 in the U.S. Federal Aviation Administration (FAA) airworthiness regulations for transport category aircraft. This revision also harmonizes with international airworthiness regulations such as European Union Aviation Safety Agency (EASA) CS–25.1309.

- ARP4754 Revision B is an interim release meant to expedite consistency with ARP4761 Revision A, "Safety Assessment Process", which was also released in December 2023.
- While the general principles of FDAL/IDAL assignment and safety assessment process were retained in ARP4754B/ED-79B, the details of these activities and process were transferred to ARP4761A/ED-135.
- Pending major adjustments to ARP4754 are deferred to a future Revision C.

== Objectives of the document ==
Emphasizing safety aspects, the Aerospace Recommended Practice (ARP) is a guideline for development of civil aircraft and systems. Revision A was a substantial rewrite of the document which describes the safety process as a part of an Integrated Development Process. A significant new section is devoted to the process of determining Development Assurance Level (DAL) which determines the assurance rigor of development and verification activities for complex hardware and software aspects of airborne systems.

ARP4754 is intended to be used in conjunction with the safety assessment process defined in SAE ARP4761 (updated to Revision A in December 2023) and is supported by other aviation standards such as RTCA DO-178C/DO-178B and DO-254.

This guideline addresses Functional Safety and design assurance processes. DAL allocation pertaining to functional failure conditions and hazard severity are assigned to help mitigate risks. Functional Hazard Analyses / Assessments are central to determining hazards and assigning DAL, in addition to requirements based testing and other verification methods. This guideline concerns itself with Physical (item) DAL and Functional (software/systems integration behavior) DAL and the Safety aspects of systems for the whole life-cycle for systems that implement aircraft functions.

== History ==
ARP4754 was defined in the context of aircraft certification, in particular Part 25 Sections 1301 and 1309 of harmonized civil aviation regulations for transport category airplanes. These are found in the U.S. FAA Federal Aviation Regulations (FAR) at 14 CFR 25.1309 and the corresponding European JAA Joint Aviation Requirements (JAR), which have been replaced by EASA certification standards. FAA Advisory Circular AC 25.1309-1A, System Design and Analysis, explained certification methodology for Part 25 Section 1309.

In May 1996, the FAA Aviation Rulemaking Advisory Committee (ARAC) was tasked with a review of harmonized FAR/JAR 25.1309, AC 1309-1A, and related documents, and to consider revision to AC 1309-1A incorporating recent practice, increasing complex integration between aircraft functions and the systems that implement them, and the implications of new technology. This task was published in the Federal Register as 61 FR 26246-26247 (1996-05-24). The focus was to be on safety assessment and fault-tolerant critical systems.

In a parallel effort, SAE published ARP4754 in November 1996. In 2002 ARAC submitted to the FAA a draft Notice of Proposed Rulemaking (NPRM) and draft revision AC 1309-1B (the draft ARSENAL version) recognizing the role of ARP4754 in complex system certification. Draft B of AC 25.1309-1 remains unreleased, but ARP4754 became broadly recognized as an appropriate standard for aircraft system development and certification and aircraft have been certified under the AC 25.1309-1B-Arsenal draft. The corresponding EASA Acceptable Means of Compliance AMC 25.1309 (included as a section of CS-25) does recognize ARP4754/ED–79.

The FAA and EASA have both subsequently recognized ARP4754/ED–79 as valid for certification of other aircraft categories, and for specific systems such as avionic databuses. ARP4754A and ED79A were released by SAE and EUROCAE in December 2010 with the document title changed to Guidelines For Development Of Civil Aircraft and Systems. ARP4754A recognizes AMC 25.1309 (published in 2003) and AC 25.1309-1B-Arsenal draft. This revision expands the design assurance concept for application at the aircraft and system level and standardizes on the use of the term development assurance. As a consequence, Functional Development Assurance Level (FDAL) is introduced for aircraft and systems concerns and the term Design Assurance Level has been renamed Item Development Assurance Level (IDAL). Furthermore, there is acknowledgement that the terms Error, Failure, and Failure Condition come from AMC 25.1309. The qualitative and quantitative classification of failure conditions by severity and probability now used by ARP4754A and ARP4761 are defined in AMC 25.1309/AC 25.1309–1B-Arsenal draft.

== See also ==
- AC 25.1309-1
- DO-254
- DO-178C and DO-178B
- ARP4761
- ISO 26262
- Hazard analysis
- Safety engineering
- Avionics
- Type certificate
