= AC 00-69 =

Application support of ED-12C and AC 20–115

The Advisory Circular AC 00-69, Best Practices for Airborne Software Development Assurance Using EUROCAE ED-12( ) and RTCA DO-178( ), initially issued in 2017, supports application of the active revisions of ED-12C/DO-178C and AC 20-115. The AC does not state FAA guidance, but rather provides information in the form of "best practices" complementary to the objectives of ED-12C/DO-178C.

- Notably, the guidance of FAA Order 8110.49 regarding "Software Change Impact Analysis" was removed in Revision A of that notice in 2017. The best practices that AC 00-69 now describes for Software Change Impact Analysis are much reduced and less prescriptive than what was removed from Order 8110.49.
- This AC clarifies that Data Coupling Analysis and Control Coupling Analysis are distinct activities and that both are required for satisfying objective A-7 (8) of ED-12C/DO-178C and ED-12B/DO-178B, adding that data and control coupling analyses rely upon detailed design specification of interfaces and dependencies between components.
- The AC also recommends that error handling (how the software avoids, detects, and handles runtime error) should be defined in explicit, reviewed design specifications rather than implemented ad hoc in the source code.
