= FAA Order 8110.105 =

American regulatory order

Airborne Electronic Hardware Approval Guidelines
- FAA Publication
- Abbreviation: FAA Order 8110.105
- Year started: 2008
- Latest version: B 2024
- Organization: Federal Aviation Administration
- Domain: Avionics, type certification
- Website: faa.gov

FAA Order 8110.105B, Airborne Electronic Hardware Approval Guidelines is an explanation of how Federal Aviation Administration (FAA) personnel can use and apply the publication

- DO-254, Design Assurance Guidance for Airborne Electronic Hardware, RTCA,

and the additional guidance and clarifications in advisory circular

- AC 20-152A, Development Assurance for Airborne Electronic Hardware, FAA.

The order additionally identifies

- AC 00-72, Best Practices for Airborne Electronic Hardware Design Assurance Using EUROCAE ED80() and RTCA DO 254(), FAA.

FAA Order 8110.105B defines a consistent process for certification authorities to follow when reviewing (auditing) airborne electronic hardware (AEH). To this end, this order concentrates on standardizing the number of audits to conduct and how much evidence to evaluate. This order includes worksheets that may be used to assess standardized certification authority Level of Involvement (LOI) in hardware projects.

Applicants developing under AC 20-152()/DO-254 may reference Order 8110.105B to be more informed of the number of certification liaison reviews to support and how much data is expected from them, determined by the level of involvement assessed by the certification authority.

== Revision History ==
Revision	Year	Title
Basic	2008	Simple And Complex Electronic Hardware Approval Guidance
A	2017	Simple and Complex Electronic Hardware Approval Guidance
B	2024	Airborne Electronic Hardware Approval Guidelines

Revision B canceled 8110.105A and 8110.105, Simple and Complex Electronic Hardware Approval Guidance, which had different intent and content. The two cancelled revisions originally supplemented RTCA DO-254() by explaining to private users of that standard how FAA aircraft certification staff could use that document "when working on type certification projects". They covered "specific topics of interest to the FAA that may go above and beyond content specific to DO-254." As such, these revisions were recommended for reference by developers applying under DO-254() for certification of electronic hardware designs, including those implemented in "custom micro-coded components" (ie., ASICs, PLDs, or FPGAs). Of particular interest was clarification of the guidance in DO-245 on approving simple and complex components. The original publication also gave instructions on assessing level of FAA involvement in hardware projects and the means of staging involvement in a standardize series of reviews; however, the 2017 revision removed these instructions.

The order now only gives limited instructions on the Airborne Electronic Hardware Review Process to FAA staff and designees. The previous content was removed "to eliminate duplication or conflict with AC 20-152A or AC 00-72," which were released in 2022.

== Clarification of application of DO-254 to simple electronic hardware ==
Custom micro-coded devices are typically presumed to be complex components that cannot be verified through testing alone and must be assured through formal design assurance processes such as those defined in DO-254. However, some applicants have proposed their specific applications as simple components, that is, those that can be verified through testing alone, thereby requiring much less effort to certify. DO-254 had been considered too ambiguous on its application to simple hardware. This concern was the topic of the Certification Authorities Software Team's 2007 CAST-30 position paper, Simple Electronic Hardware and DO-254 and ED-80.

In particular, Order 8110.105 originally provided clarification of DO-254 guidance for "simple" electronic hardware. Such simple hardware does not require as rigorous design assurance as complex functions installed in custom micro-coded components, for example. This definition and related recommendations were removed by Revision B, as this is now covered by the greatly expanded Revision A of AC 20-152 and the new AC 00-72, both released in 2022.

== General clarification of application of DO-254 ==
Additionally, Order 8110.105 originally addressed some of the omissions and clarification needs identified by the Certification Authorities Software Team in their position paper, CAST-31, and as such informs electronic hardware developers of interests beyond those presently expressed in DO-254. This content was removed in Revision B. The order is now only instructions for FAA Aircraft Certification Service personnel to use and apply on the Airborne Electronic Hardware Review Process.

== Background ==
Functioning electronic hardware systems and products certified through DO-254() processes range from replaceable electronic boxes, circuit boards within such enclosures, and any ASICs, PLDs, or FPGAs placed on such boards. These sorts of electronic hardware can be classified as simple or complex. With respect to DO-254(), a device is classified as simple if comprehensive inspection or testing alone can demonstrate that it is reasonably free of design defects or errors and has deterministic behavior. A complex device, then, is one that cannot be assessed by comprehensive inspection or testing alone.

For the purposes of aircraft type certification efforts, aircraft system components are designated as software or hardware. Software components are computer programs installed and operating on computers or microcontrollers and are usually subjected to the design assurance processes of RTCA DO-178() when installed in aircraft. DO-254() is applied to the certification of both simple and complex hardware components, particularly inclusive of both simple and complex custom micro-coded components. "A hardware item is considered simple if a comprehensive combination of deterministic tests and analyses can ensure correct functional performance under all foreseeable operating conditions with no anomalous behavior." All other hardware items are considered complex and, since complex hardware items cannot be completely validated by inspection and testing alone, design assurance methodology is required. Advisory Circular 20-152 recognizes the guidance in DO-254 as a suitable means for demonstrating compliance for the use of complex custom micro-coded components within aircraft systems. However, application of DO-254 to simple micro-coded components was not explicitly addressed by that circular.

Initially, applicants and developers were concerned with the apparent ambiguity of DO-254's guidance on simple electronic hardware. That document is largely concerned with the objectives and activities of developing complex electronic hardware. However, it provides only one short paragraph suggesting that a simple hardware item should be configuration controlled and verified, but "extensive documentation is not needed". In response to the concern, CAST-30 Simple Electronic Hardware and RTCA Document DO-254 and EUROCAE Document ED-80 was completed in 2007 to provide clarification to the guidance in DO-254/ED-80 specifically for simple electronic hardware. Following this, FAA Order 8110.105 was released in 2008 to supplement the guidance for both simple and complex electronic hardware, and updated to Revision A in 2017. Three primary chapters are clarification of

- topics applicable to both simple and complex electronic hardware,
- topics applicable to complex electronic hardware alone, and
- topics applicable to simple electronic hardware alone.

The particular interest in topics applicable to simple electronic hardware alone was the reduction of documentation submitted to support certification. Applicants for simple hardware were advised to submit the following:

- A plan for hardware aspects of certification
- A hardware verification plan
- A hardware configuration index
- A hardware accomplishment summary

This selection reflects that only testing, rather than rigorous design assurance, is needed to verify simple hardware.

This advice was removed in Revision B. Rather than providing any list of expected submissions, AC 00-72 now only advises simple hardware applicants that "Due to the simplicity of the device, the life cycle data is reduced.", and provides only the broadest suggestions on how the limited documentation may be covered (Section 3.1.3).
