= Hanne Riis Nielson =

Danish computer scientist

Hanne Riis Nielson (born 1954) is a computer scientist specializing in formal methods and static program analysis, particularly for applications involving computer security and software safety.

== Education and career ==
As Hanne Riis, she earned a master's degree from Aarhus University with the 1980 thesis Subclasses of Attribute Grammars. She completed a Ph.D. in 1984 at the University of Edinburgh, with the dissertation Hoare Logics for Run-Time Analysis of Programs, supervised by Gordon Plotkin.

She was a professor in computer science and engineering at the Technical University of Denmark, where she headed the Section on Language Based Technology.

== Books ==
Nielson's books include:

- Semantics with Applications: A Formal Introduction (with Flemming Nielson, Wiley, 1992)
- Type And Effect Systems: Behaviours For Concurrency (with Torben Amtoft and Flemming Nielson, Imperial College Press, 1999)
- Principles of Program Analysis (with Flemming Nielson and Chris Hankin, Springer, 1999)
- Two-Level Functional Languages (with Flemming Nielson, Cambridge University Press, 2005)
- Semantics with Applications: An Appetizer (with Flemming Nielson, Springer, 2007)
- Formal Methods: An Appetizer (with Flemming Nielson, Springer, 2019)

== Recognition ==
In 2016, a festschrift was published in honor of the 60th birthdays of Nielson and Flemming Nielson.
