= DO-297 =

Standard for Integrated Modular Avionics

Integrated Modular Avionics (IMA) Development Guidance and Certification Considerations
- Abbreviation: DO-297; ED-124
- Latest version: 8 November 2005
- Organization: RTCA SC-200; EUROCAE WG-60
- Domain: Aviation
- Website: RTCA.org

DO-297, Integrated Modular Avionics (IMA) Development Guidance and Certification Considerations is one of the primary document by which certification authorities such as the FAA and EASA approve Integrated Modular Avionics (IMA) systems for flight. The FAA Advisory Circular (AC) 20-170 refers to DO-297.

Along with ARINC 653 and DO-248, the DO-297 standard guides "Safety of flight for IMA systems" DO-297 provides specific guidance for the stakeholders, defining the following roles

- platform and module suppliers
- application suppliers
- IMA system
- integrator
- certification applicant
- maintenance organization
- certification authority.

The DO-297 standard formalizes the use of more powerful computing hardware to host multiple software functions of mixed safety-criticality. IMA produces benefits of reduced Size, Weight, and Power (SWaP) by integrating into a single computing platform software functions that were formerly on separate (federated) computing systems. The standard describes how safety is maintained through the isolation provided by a partitioning environment, ensuring that independent functions cannot adversely impact one another's behavior.

== History ==
The document was published by RTCA, Incorporated, in a joint effort with EUROCAE, completed in November 2005. The lessons learned in certifying early approaches to IMA in commercial aircraft such as the Boeing 787 Dreamliner and the Airbus A380 helped inform the development of the standard.
