= Aircraft logbook =

An aircraft logbook, also referred to as a technical log or journey log, is the official record of an aircraft's operation and maintenance history. It serves as the primary legal record of airworthiness, documents flight details, inspections, repairs, modifications, and compliance with airworthiness directives (ADs) and service bulletins (SBs).

The logbook is divided into defined sections. The journey log records operational data, including aircraft registration, date, crew, departure and arrival aerodromes, flight time, and flight purpose. The maintenance section records technical status, including total hours and cycles, life-limited components, deferred defects, and corrective actions. In commercial operations, these records are typically part of a multipart system to ensure redundancy between the aircraft and the operator’s maintenance control system.

== Regulatory framework ==
Global standards for logbook requirements are established by the International Civil Aviation Organization (ICAO). ICAO Annex 6 requires aircraft engaged in international operations to maintain a journey log containing specified flight information. ICAO recommends a minimum retention period of six months, while individual states impose specific requirements through national regulations.

== By region ==
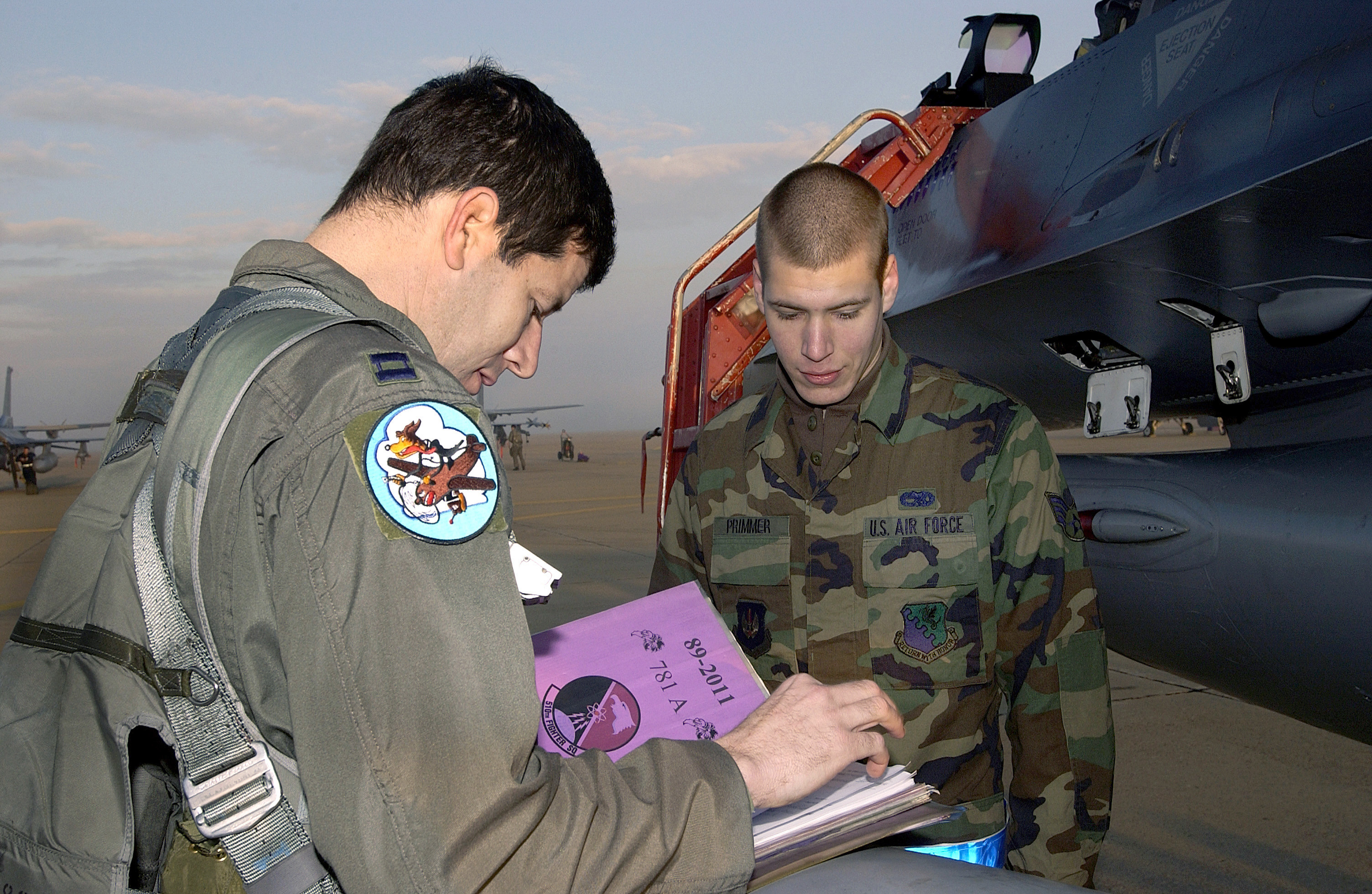
United States Air Force commanders writing on a logbook.

=== United States ===
In the United States, the Federal Aviation Administration (FAA) regulates maintenance records under the Federal Aviation Regulations (FAR) 91.417. Owners are required to document all maintenance, alterations, and AD compliance. Commercial operators under Parts 121 and 135 must carry a maintenance log on board to record mechanical discrepancies and corrective actions. Private operations under Part 91 are not required to carry physical logbooks on the aircraft.

=== Canada ===
In Canada, Transport Canada requires the carriage of a journey log under the Canadian Aviation Regulations (CARs). CAR 605.95 mandates that a journey log be carried on board for flights that do not begin and end at the same aerodrome without shutdown, with entries made promptly by the pilot-in-command.

=== European Union ===
The European Union Aviation Safety Agency (EASA) standardizes requirements across member states. Under EASA Part ORO and Commercial Air Transport (CAT) rules, commercial operators must carry a technical log on board for each flight. Continuing airworthiness requirements under Part M and Part CAMO require all aircraft to maintain a journey log or equivalent record. EASA mandates retention of technical log entries for at least 36 months after the final entry.

Following Brexit, the Civil Aviation Authority (CAA) retained comparable requirements. Commercial aircraft are required to carry a technical log in accordance with CAP 2606A.

=== Australia and other jurisdictions ===
Australia implemented Civil Aviation Safety Regulations (CASR) Part 91 in 2021, aligning national requirements with ICAO standards. CASR Part 91 requires aircraft to carry a journey log for flights beginning or ending outside Australian territory. In India, the Directorate General of Civil Aviation (DGCA) prescribes standardized logbook formats under the Aircraft Rules of 1937.

== Technological transition ==
Aircraft logbooks were historically maintained as paper records. The industry has increasingly transitioned to Electronic Technical Log (ETL) systems. Regulatory authorities have adapted accordingly. The FAA issued advisory circular AC 120-78 to define standards for electronic records and signatures, while EASA permits digital systems that meet data integrity and traceability requirements.

Airline adoption of ETL systems enables real-time integration of flight data and defect reporting with maintenance management systems, reducing transcription errors, which are estimated to occur in 30–50% of manual paper entries. In 2021, India's DGCA introduced a centralized electronic logbook platform.
