= DO-232 =

Operations Concepts for Data Link Applications of Flight Information Services
- Abbreviation: DO-232
- Latest version: March 14, 1996
- Organization: RTCA SC-169
- Domain: Aviation

DO-232 is an air traffic control software standard published by RTCA, Incorporated.

Flight Information Services (FIS) is defined as the non-control information needed by pilots to operate in the US National Airspace System (NAS) and internationally. The timely, efficient exchange of FIS data is required for safety, efficiency and utility in aircraft operations. Pilots, flight planners (e.g., pilots, dispatchers, schedulers), and controllers all need accurate, timely FIS data to plan (or re-plan) and assess the execution of flight operations.

== Outline of contents ==
1. Introduction
2. FIS Data Link - Concepts and Needs
3. FIS Data Link in the FANS CNS/ATM Environment
4. System Architecture and Implementation Considerations
5. Current FIS Data Link Products and Plans
6. Summary and Recommendations
- Appendix A: The National Aviation Weather Users Forum
- Appendix B: Operational Descriptions of Initial FIS Request/Reply Data Link Products
- Appendix C: Additional Details of Some of the Various Candidate Airborne Data Link Channels
- Appendix D: Analysis Criteria - SAMA Preliminary Study

== See also ==
- Air traffic control
- ACARS
- Flight Information and Control of Operations
