= Mixed criticality =

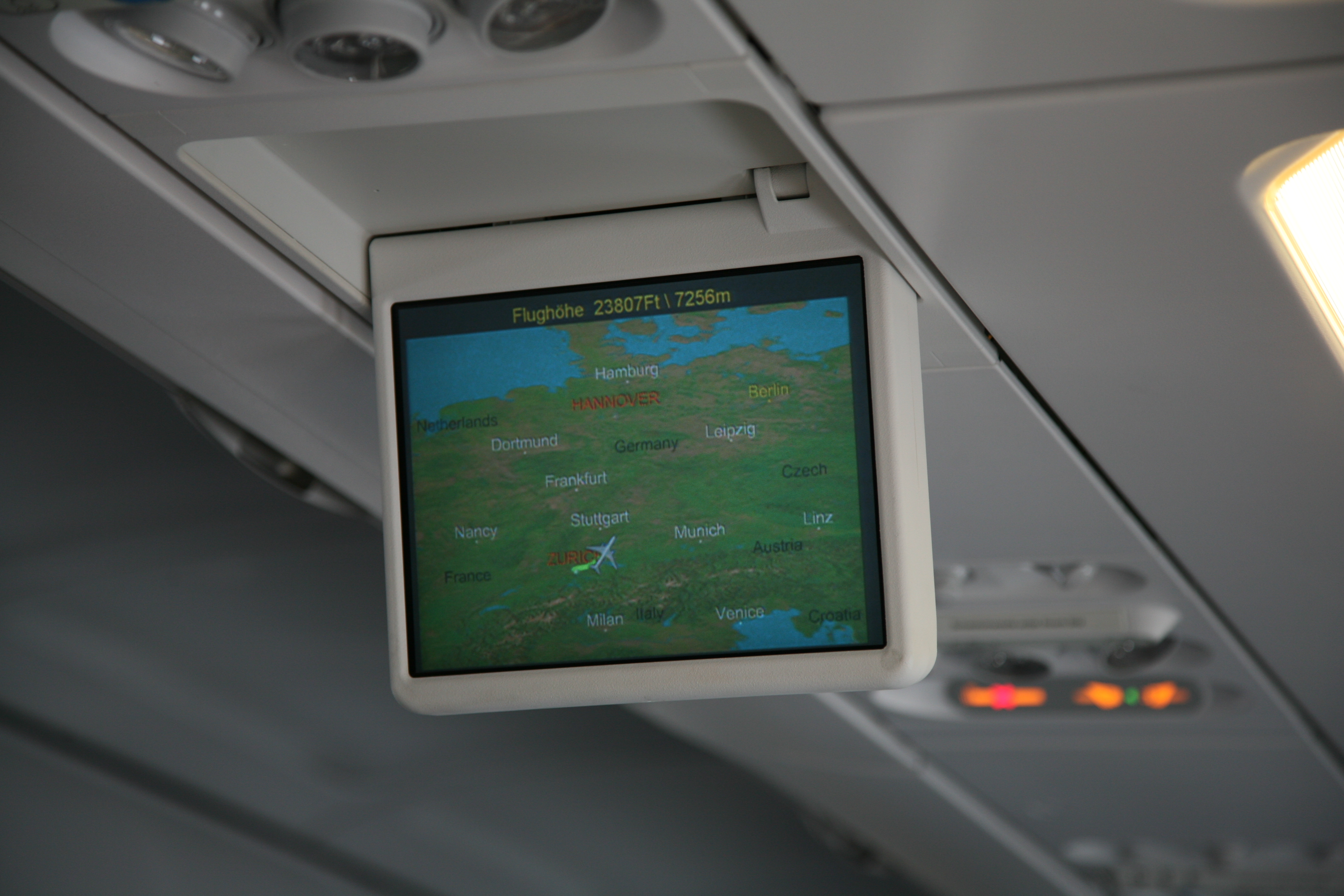
Airplane in-flight information system has much lower criticality than flight control systems, yet both coexist in one "mixed criticality" machine.

A mixed criticality system is a system containing computer hardware and software that can execute several applications of different criticality, such as safety-critical and non-safety critical, or of different safety integrity level (SIL). Different criticality applications are engineered to different levels of assurance, with high criticality applications being the most costly to design and verify. These kinds of systems are typically embedded in a machine such as an aircraft whose safety must be ensured.

== Principle ==
Traditional safety-critical systems had to be tested and certified in their entirety to show that they were safe to use. However, many such systems are composed of a mixture of safety-critical and non-critical parts, as for example when an aircraft contains a passenger entertainment system that is isolated from the safety-critical flight systems. Some issues to address in mixed criticality systems include real-time behaviour, memory isolation, data and control coupling.

Computer scientists have developed techniques for handling systems which thus have mixed criticality, but there are many challenges remaining especially for multi-core hardware.

== Priority and criticality ==
Basically, most errors are currently committed when making confusion between priority attribution and criticality management. As priority defines an order between different tasks or messages to be transmitted inside a system, criticality defines classes of messages which can have different parameters depending on the current use case. For example, in case of car crash avoidance or obstacle anticipation, camera sensors can suddenly emit messages more often, and so create an overload in the system. That is when we need to make Mixed-Criticality operate : to select messages to absolutely guarantee on the system in these overload cases.

== Research projects ==
EU funded research projects on mixed criticality include:

- MultiPARTES
- DREAMS
- PROXIMA
- CONTREX
- SAFURE
- CERTAINTY
- VIRTICAL
- T-CREST
- PROARTIS
- ACROSS (Artemis)
- EMC2 (Artemis)
- RECOMP Artemis
- ARAMIS (in German) and ARAMIS II
- IMPReSS

UK EPSRC funded research projects on mixed criticality include:

- MCC

Several research projects have decided to present their research results at the EU-funded Mixed-Criticality Forum

== Workshops and seminars ==
Workshops and seminars on Mixed Criticality Systems include:

- 1st International Workshop on Mixed Criticality Systems (WMC 2013)
- 2nd International Workshop on Mixed Criticality Systems (WMC 2014)
- 3rd International Workshop on Mixed Criticality Systems (WMC 2015)
- 4th International Workshop on Mixed Criticality Systems (WMC 2015)
- Dagstuhl Seminar on Mixed Criticality on Multicore/Manycore Platforms (2015)
- Dagstuhl Seminar on Mixed Criticality on Multicore/Manycore Platforms (2017)
