= DO-254 =

Document for guidance of airborne electronic hardware

Design Assurance Guidance for Airborne Electronic Hardware
- Abbreviation: DO-254; ED-80
- Latest version: April 19, 2000
- Organization: RTCA SC-180; EUROCAE WG-46
- Domain: Aviation electronics

RTCA DO-254 / EUROCAE ED-80, Design Assurance Guidance for Airborne Electronic Hardware is a document providing guidance for the development of airborne electronic hardware, published by RTCA, Incorporated and EUROCAE. Initially released in 2000, the DO-254/ED-80 standard was not necessarily considered policy until recognized by the FAA in 2005 through AC 20-152 as a means of compliance for the design assurance of electronic hardware in airborne systems. The guidance in this document is applicable, but not limited, to such electronic hardware items as

- Line Replaceable Units (quickly replaceable components)
- Circuit board assemblies (CBA)
- Custom micro-coded components such as field programmable gate arrays (FPGA), programmable logic devices (PLD), and application-specific integrated circuits (ASIC), including any associated macro functions
- Integrated technology components such as hybrid integrated circuits and multi-chip modules
- Commercial off-the-shelf (COTS) components

The document classifies electronic hardware items into simple or complex categories. An item is simple "if a comprehensive combination of deterministic tests and analyses appropriate to the design assurance level can ensure correct functional performance under all foreseeable operating conditions with no anomalous behavior." Conversely, a complex item is one that cannot have correct functional performance ensured by tests and analyses alone; so, assurance must be accomplished by additional means. The body of DO-254/ED-80 establishes objectives and activities for the systematic design assurance of complex electronic hardware, generally presumed to be complex custom micro-coded components, as listed above. However, simple electronic hardware is within the scope of DO-254/ED-80 and applicants propose and use the guidance in this standard to obtain certification approval of simple custom micro-coded components, especially devices that support higher level (A/B) aircraft functions.

The DO-254/ED-80 standard is the counterpart to the well-established software standard RTCA DO-178C/EUROCAE ED-12C. With DO-254/ED-80, the certification authorities have indicated that avionics equipment contains both hardware and software, and each is critical to safe operation of aircraft. There are five levels of compliance, A through E, which depend on the effect a failure of the hardware will have on the operation of the aircraft. Level A is the most stringent, defined as "catastrophic" effect (e.g., loss of the aircraft), while a failure of Level E hardware will not affect the safety of the aircraft. Meeting Level A compliance for complex electronic hardware requires a much higher level of verification and validation than Level E compliance.

== System aspects of hardware design assurance ==
The main regulations that must be followed are the capturing and tracking of requirements throughout the design and verification process. The following items of substantiation are required to be provided to the FAA, or the Designated Engineering Representative (DER) representing the FAA:

- Plan for Hardware Aspects of Certification (PHAC)
- Hardware Verification Plan (HVP)
- Top-Level Drawing
- Hardware Accomplishment Summary (HAS)

== Process overview ==
=== Hardware design and verification ===
The hardware design and hardware verification need to be done independently. The hardware designer works to ensure the design of the hardware will meet the defined requirements. Meanwhile, the verification engineer will generate a verification plan which will allow for testing the hardware to verify that it meets all of its derived requirements.

=== Planning process ===
The planning process is the first step where the design authority (the company who develops the H/W and implements the COTS into its design) declares its approach towards the certification. At this point the PHAC (Plan for H/W Aspects of Certification) is presented to the authorities (EASA, FAA...). In this plan, the developer presents its approach and how DO-254/ED-80 is implemented. The PHAC is submitted as part of the authorities 1st stage of involvement (SOI#1).

- EASA wrote a certification memoranda to require the use of DO-254 for all complex electronics within a system, stating that all equipment and CBA with a Design assurance classification of A, B, C or D should meet level D objectives for the equipment and CBA, regardless of the DAL of the system or aircraft function.
- FAA wrote a Final Report for System-Level Assurance of Airborne Electronic stating that CBA do not reach a level of complexity that would require such a structured development process to be fully deployed; a verification testing approach is deemed sufficient to providing assurance.

For a generic DO-254 based process, a job aid is provided including the Stages of Involvement (SOIs) defined by FAA on the "Airborne Electronic Hardware Review Job Aid".

=== Hardware design processes ===
- Requirements Capture
- Conceptual Design
- Detailed Design
- Implementation
- Verification
- Transfer to production

=== Validation and verification process ===
The hardware requirement validation process provides assurance that the hardware item derived requirements are correct and complete with respect to system requirements allocated to the hardware item. Validation of hardware requirements allocated from system requirements is a system process, rather than a hardware process. As such, hardware requirements that are derived by hardware processes should be identified to system processes for validation against the system requirements. For the purposes of this document's processes, a requirement is complete when all the attributes that have been defined are necessary and that all the necessary attributes have been defined, and a requirement is correct when the requirement is defined without ambiguity and there are no errors in the defined attributes.

The verification process provides assurance that the hardware item implementation meets all of the hardware requirements, including derived requirements. Methods of verification include qualitative review, quantitative analysis, and functional testing.

A widely used industry definition for the difference is:

- Validation - designing the right system!
- Verification - designing the system right!

=== Additional considerations ===
- Configuration Management Process
- Process Assurance
- Certification Liaison Process
- Hardware Design Life Cycle Data
- Use of Previously Developed Hardware
- Commercial-Off-The Shelf (COTS) Components Usage
- Product Service Experience
- Tool Assessment and Qualification
- Appendix A. Modulation of Hardware Life Cycle Data Based on Hardware Design Assurance Level
- Appendix B. Design Assurance Considerations for Level A and B Functions
- Appendix C. Glossary of Terms
- Appendix D. Acronyms

=== Important considerations ===
- Section 1.6, Complexity Considerations, presents the definition for simple and complex hardware items.
- Table 5–1, Typical ASIC/PLD Process Mapping, presents a process mapping very useful for practical application considering the scope of AC 20-152.
- Appendix B Design Assurance Considerations for Level A and B Functions - the longest chapter of the document - prepares the future of embedded electronics, paving the way for advanced design and verification methods, well known to the outside world, but fairly new for the avionics industry.

=== Application to simple electronic hardware ===
While simple electronic hardware (SEH) is within the scope of DO-254/ED-80, its guidance on the subject has been considered inadequate among applicants seeking certification of simple electronic hardware. The Certification Authorities Software Team published the Position Paper CAST-30, Simple Electronic Hardware and RTCA Document DO-254 and EUROCAE Document ED-80, to provide clarification to the guidance for simple electronic hardware. This clarification was amplified as FAA guidance in FAA Order 8110.105.

Essentially, for simple electronic hardware, the verification through “comprehensive combination of deterministic testing and analysis” that justifies the simple classification needs to be defined, performed, and recorded. However, the appropriate "rigor and thoroughness" of that verification depends on the hardware design assurance level. For Level A/B, test coverage analysis should confirm that all nodes and interconnections have been exercised (comparable to DO-178C structural coverage objectives), while for Level C it is only needed to demonstrate correct operation under all combinations and permutations of conditions applied only to the inputs of the device (black box), and Level D testing can be accomplished through indirect tests applied to the system that has the item installed.

If certification as a simple electronic device is sought, minimal documentation still should be submitted. A Plan for Hardware Aspects of Certification (PHAC) should be submitted to communicate the justification and means of certification, and a Hardware Verification Plan should be submitted to communicate the rigor and methods of the deterministic testing and analysis. Hardware Accomplishment Summary should be submitted to show compliance to the PHAC, and a Hardware Configuration Index should be submitted to define the production baseline that is the subject of the Hardware Identification and Compliance Statement in the Hardware Accomplishment Summary.

== Resources ==
- FAR Part 23/25 §1301/§1309
- FAR Part 27/29
- AC 23/25.1309-1

== Certification in Europe ==
- Replace FAA with EASA, JAA or CAA
- Replace CFR with CS
- Replace AC with AMC (Acceptable Means of Compliance) or AMJ (Advisory Material Joint)

== See also ==
- Avionics
- Hazard analysis
- DO-178C (similar to DO-254/ED-80, but for software)
- ARP4761 (safety assessment)
- ARP4754 (systems)
- CAST-31
