= DO-248 =

Supporting Information for DO-178C and DO-278A
- Abbreviation: DO-248C
- Latest version: December 13, 2011
- Organization: RTCA SC-205
- Domain: Aviation

DO-248C, Supporting Information for DO-178C and DO-278A, published by RTCA, Incorporated, is a collection of Frequently Asked Questions and Discussion Papers addressing applications of DO-178C and DO-278A in the safety assurance of software for aircraft and software for CNS/ATM systems, respectively. Like DO-178C and DO-278A, it is a joint RTCA undertaking with EUROCAE and the document is also published as ED-94C, Supporting Information for ED-12C and ED-109A. The publication does not provide any guidance additional to DO-178C or DO-278A; rather, it only provides clarification for the guidance established in those standards. The present revision is also expanded to include the "Rationale for DO-178C/DO-278A" section to document items that were considered when developing DO-178B and then DO-178C, DO-278A, and DO-330, as well as the supplements that accompany those publications (DO-331, DO-332, DO-333).

Corresponding with the releases of DO-178C and DO-278A, the present revision, DO-248C, is an update to the previous revision DO-248B, Report for Clarification of DO-178B "Software Considerations in Airborne Systems and Equipment Certification". While new FAQs and discussion papers have been added, most of the FAQs and discussion papers of DO-248C are carried over from DO-248B. Some of these items have been marked as deleted or updated as the subjects were addressed by the releases of DO-178C, DO-330, supplements, or other publications. An errata section is not included as the release of DO-178C addressed the errata of DO-178B and no DO-178C errata have been published.

Initially, this publication was an annual clarification report, DO-248B (2001) was preceded by DO-248A (2000) and DO-248 (1999).

== Outline of contents ==
DO-248C contains the following:

- Rationale for each process objective of DO-178C/DO-278A
- 84 frequently asked questions (some noted as either deleted, removed or addressed by other publications)
- 21 discussion papers:

1. Verification Tool Selection Considerations
2. The Relationship of DO-178B/ED-12B to the Code of Federal Regulations (CFRs) and Joint Aviation Requirements (JARs)
3. The Differences Between DO-178A and DO-178B Guidance for Meeting the Objective of Structural Coverage
4. Service History Use—Rationale for DO-178C
5. Application of Potential Alternative Methods Compliance for Previously Developed Software (PDS)
6. Transition Criteria
7. Definition of Commonly Used Verification Terms
8. Structural Coverage and Safety Objectives
9. Certification With Known Software Problems
10. Considerations Addressed When Deciding to Use Previously Developed Software (PDS)
11. Qualification of a Tool Using Service History (Removed, see DO-330)
12. Object Code to Source Code Traceability Issues
13. Definitions of Statement Coverage, Decision Coverage, and Modified Condition/Decision Coverage (MC/DC)
14. Partitioning Aspects in DO-178C/DO-278A
15. Relationship Between Regression Testing and Hardware Changes
16. Cache Management
17. Usage of Floating-Point Arithmetic
18. Service Experience Rationale for DO-278A
19. Independence in DO-178C/DO-278A
20. Parameter Data Items and Adaptation Data Items
21. Clarification on Single Event Upset (SEU) as It Relates to Software
