= Transport category =

Transport category is a classification group of aircraft for the purpose of airworthiness certification. The name "transport category" is used in the US, Canada, Europe and many other countries in certification of large civil airplanes and large civil helicopters.

== Concept of transport category classification ==
A principle behind transport category design standards is that any element in an airplane or helicopter can fail, but the risk of such a failure causing an accident should be acceptable under certain airworthiness requirements. Consequently, transport category airplanes and helicopters have duplicated elements wherever failure of one element is likely to cause an accident. For example, transport category airplanes must have at least two engines and be flown by at least two pilots. The loads on the wings and tailplanes are usually carried by multiple load paths. If one element of the primary structure fails due to metal fatigue or corrosion the remaining sound elements of the structure must carry the loads until the failed structural element is discovered in scheduled maintenance.

This fail-safe principle is not required in airplanes and helicopters that are not certificated in the transport category. If an element in a transport category airplane or helicopter is not highly critical, or if its failure is relatively benign, it is possible for that element not to be duplicated. For example, most transport category airplanes do not have duplicated nosewheel assemblies; and some do not have duplicated wheels on each main undercarriage. A transport category helicopter is permitted to have only one main rotor head, and may have only one engine. If a transport category helicopter has only one engine it is only eligible to be a Class B (or Performance Group 2) helicopter. An example of a transport category helicopter with only one engine is the Bell 204/205.

== Airworthiness standards ==
In the United States, Federal Aviation Regulations Parts 25 and 29 are applied to the design and certification of transport category airplanes and helicopters respectively. In Europe the European Aviation Safety Agency has similar certification requirements, also titled Parts 25 and 29, for application to transport category airplanes and helicopters.

=== FAA ===
==== Airplanes ====
Design requirements for the transport category airplanes do not specify upper or lower limits on the maximum takeoff weight (MTOW) or number of seats but examples of these airplanes are typically:

- Jets with 10 or more passenger seats or maximum takeoff weights greater than 12,500 lb (5700 kg); or
- Modern propeller-driven airplanes with more than 19 passenger seats or a MTOW greater than 19,000 lb (8618 kg); or
- Older propeller-driven airplanes with MTOW greater than 12,500 lb (e.g. Boeing 247 13,650 lb, CASA C-212 Aviocar 17,000 lb)

Easily recognizable examples of transport category airplanes are Boeing and Airbus aircraft, Learjet 35, de Havilland Canada Dash 8, Embraer EMB 120 Brasilia.

==== Helicopters ====
Design requirements for the transport category rotorcraft do not specify upper or lower limits on the maximum takeoff weight or number of passenger seats but examples of these helicopters typically have maximum takeoff weights greater than 7,000 lb (3 175 kg).

Easily recognisable examples of transport category helicopters are Bell 412, Eurocopter AS332 Super Puma, MBB/Kawasaki BK 117, AgustaWestland AW139.
