= AC 20-115 =

Airborne Software Development Assurance Using EUROCAE ED-12( ) and RTCA DO-178( )
- FAA Publication
- Abbreviation: AC 20-115
- Year started: 1982
- Latest version: D 2017
- Organization: Federal Aviation Administration
- Predecessor: C
- Domain: Aviation safety
- Website: FAA

The Advisory Circular AC 20-115( ), Airborne Software Development Assurance Using EUROCAE ED-12( ) and RTCA DO-178( ) (previously Airborne Software Assurance), recognizes the RTCA published standard DO-178 as defining a suitable means for demonstrating compliance with applicable airworthiness regulations for the use of software within aircraft systems. The present revision D of the circular identifies ED-12/DO-178 Revision C as the active revision of that standard and particularly acknowledges the synchronization of ED-12 and DO-178 at that revision.

This Advisory Circular calls attention to ED-12C/DO-178C as "an acceptable means, but not the only means," to secure FAA approval of software. The earliest revisions of the Advisory Circular were brief, serving little more than to call attention to active DO-178 revisions. The Advisory Circular revisions C and D are considerably longer, giving guidance in modifying and re-using software previously approved using DO-178, DO-178A, or DO-178B (preceding revisions of the DO-178 standard). Additionally, the expanded AC now provides guidance for Field Loadable Software and User Modifiable Software within aircraft software. Transition of legacy tool qualification from DO-178B to DO-330 is also discussed, with comparison of ED-12B/DO-178B Tool Qualification Type with ED-12C/ED-215 DO-178C/DO-330 Tool Qualification Level.

== Harmonized Software EASA AMC 20-115D ==
Simultaneously with the publication of FAA AC 20-115D, EASA issued AMC 20-115D. This EASA Acceptable Means of Compliance (AMC) publication resulted from 2 years of coordinate effort with the FAA on AMC 20-115D to improve harmonization and mutual recognition between the civil aviation authorities. AMC 20-115D and AC 20-115D are technically identical. However, there are some wording differences.

Comparison of Statements Regarding Acceptable and Alternate Means of Compliance
| EASA AMC 20-115D | FAA AC 20-115D |
|---|---|
| Compliance with this AMC is not mandatory and therefore an applicant may elect to use an alternative means of compliance (AltMoC). | This AC is not mandatory and does not constitute a regulation. |
| However, the AltMoC must meet the relevant requirements, ensure an equivalent level of software safety as this AMC, and be approved by the European Aviation Safety Agency (EASA) on a product or ETSO article basis. | However, if you use the means described in the AC, you must follow it in all applicable respects. |

== Revision History ==
History of AC 20-115
| Revision | Year | Summary |
|---|---|---|
| AC 20-115 | 1982 | Called attention to RTCA DO-178. |
| AC 20-115A | 1986 | Called attention to RTCA DO-178A. |
| AC 20-115B | 1993 | Called attention to RTCA DO-178B. |
| AC 20-115C | 2013 | Calls attention to RTCA DO-178C w/guidance for Rev B to Rev C change. |
| AC 20-115D | 2017 | Minor updates largely to harmonize with EASA guidance. Additional Guidance for Field Loadable Software and for User Modifiable Software. |
