= Radio Technical Commission for Aeronautics =

American organisation that develops aviation standards

RTCA, Inc. (formerly known as Radio Technical Commission for Aeronautics) is a United States non-profit organization that develops technical guidance for use by government regulatory authorities and by industry. It was founded in 1935 and was re-incorporated in 1991 as a private not-for-profit corporation. It has over 20 active committees with multiple working groups under each committee and develops industry standards in cooperation with aviation regulators from around the world including the FAA.

Requirements for membership are limited to organizations (e.g., private industry, government, academic, and research and development) that have an interest and skill in the aviation industry and are willing to provide those skills through the work of their employees who volunteer their time and energy to produce usable and complete engineering standards documents. Standards are developed and drafted by special committees (SC) and are approved by the Program Management Committee, which oversees the activities of the special committees. Documents are developed are consensus documents meaning that all participants can agree with the content, not that they agree 100% with everything that is said in the document. Many of RTCA documents begin with the letters DO which stands for document.

RTCA develops minimum operating performance standards for aviation-based technology (typically avionics) but has developed standards for such far-ranging topics as airport security, counter-UAS detection standards, and aircraft cockpit and cabin cleaning standards.

The documents of RTCA include:

- Operational services and environment definition (OSED) document the environment in which equipment will operate
- Operational, safety, & performance requirements (SPR)
- Operational safety assessment (OSA); operational performance assessment (OPA) (communication, navigation, surveillance)
- Interoperability requirements (INTEROP)
- Minimum aviation system performance standards (MASPS)
- Minimum operational performance standards (MOPS) assuring equipment will perform its intended functions

RTCA is not an agency of the United States government but works with regulators around the globe to develop standards that may be referenced in their regulatory framework. RTCA is an official observer to the International Civil Aviation Organization (ICAO).

== See also ==
- Category:RTCA standards
- DO-160
- DO-178C
- DO-219
- DO-232
- DO-254
