= European Organisation for Civil Aviation Equipment =

Aviation standardisation organisation

The European Organisation for Civil Aviation Equipment (EUROCAE) is an international organisation that deals exclusively with aviation standardisation, for both airborne and ground systems and equipment. It was created in 1963 in Lucerne, Switzerland by a decision of the European Civil Aviation Conference as a European forum focusing on electronic equipment for air transport. The organisation's offices are based in Saint-Denis, France near Paris.

== History and operations ==
EUROCAE has now been operating for more than 60 years as a non-profit organisation whose membership comprises aviation stakeholders made up of regulators, manufacturers, services providers, users (such as airlines and airports) and academia. The membership is not limited to the European region.

From the outset, EUROCAE has developed performance specifications and other documents exclusively dedicated to the aviation community. EUROCAE documents are widely referenced by the International Civil Aviation Organisation (ICAO) as Guidance Material and by the European Aviation Safety Agency (EASA) as means of compliance to European Technical Standard Orders (ETSOs) and other regulatory documents.

To achieve the desired global harmonisation of aviation standards, EUROCAE has a close cooperation with RTCA, Inc. and SAE International. About 50% of the EUROCAE Working Groups (WG) work jointly with RTCA, and another 10% with SAE. The joint development of standards and the subsequent reference of those standards by EASA and the FAA as Acceptable Means of Compliance allows for a globally harmonised implementation of specific applications or systems based on the state of the art technology. This includes aircraft but also satellites.

EUROCAE documents are also produced in the context of the applicable ICAO standards and are coherent with existing ARINC specifications to ensure global interoperability.

=== Organisation ===
EUROCAE has currently more than 450 members, according to its own statements.

EUROCAE documents (ED) are developed by the Working Groups (WG) composed of voluntary experts from the member organisations of EUROCAE and – in case of joint activities - RTCA and SAE. Before publication EDs undergo a rigorous internal and external scrutiny process (Open Consultation) to ensure the high quality of the approved standards. Since its creation EUROCAE has published more than 450 EDs.

The EUROCAE governance is led by the Council, which is composed of senior staff from full members of the Association who are elected by the annual General Assembly. A Technical Advisory Committee consisting of technical experts in various aviation domains advises the Council in technical decisions. The day-to-day work of the organisation is carried out by the EUROCAE Secretariat, a collective term for the Secretary General, Programme Managers and administrative staff.
