= IPS =

IPS, iPS, Ips or IPs may refer to:

== Science and technology ==
=== Biology and medicine ===
- Ips (beetle), a genus of bark beetle
- Induced pluripotent stem cell, or iPS cells
- Intermittent photic stimulation, a neuroimaging technique
- Intraparietal sulcus, a region of the brain

=== Computing ===
- In-plane switching, a screen technology used for liquid-crystal displays
- Image Packaging System, OpenSolaris software
- Instructions per second, a measure of a computer's processor speed
- Internet Provider Security
- Interpreter for Process Structures, used in AMSAT satellites
- International Patching System file extension, see ROM hacking
- Indoor positioning system, for wireless location indoors
- Intrusion prevention system, network security appliance

=== Units of measure ===
- Inch per second, a unit of speed
- Inch–pound–second system of units, a system of measurement sometimes used in engineering (i.e. CAD design)
- Iron pipe size

=== Other uses in science and technology ===
- Inboard performance system, for watercraft by Volvo Penta
- Inclined plate settler, a type of clarifier used in water purification; See Lamella clarifier
- Interplanetary Superhighway, a collection of gravitationally determined pathways through the Solar System
- Introductory Physical Science
- IPS/UPS, an electric power transmission grid of some CIS countries
- Iron pipe size, nominal pipe size, originally based upon internal diameter of a pipe
- Integrated Product Support, a group of norms (S-Series) maintained by ASD and AIA and A4A
- Inverse photoemission spectroscopy, a spectroscopy technique

== Organizations ==
=== International ===
- Industrial and provident society, in the UK, Ireland, and New Zealand
- Industrial Promotion Services of the Aga Khan Fund for Economic Development
- Institute of Professional Sound
- Inter Press Service, a global news agency
- International Parliamentary Scholarship
- International Planetarium Society
- International Polarisation Scale
- International Primatological Society
- International Professional Surfers
- International Pyrotechnics Society

=== United States ===
- Ford Dorsey Program in International Policy Studies
- Indianapolis Public Schools
- Institute for Policy Studies
- Institute for the Psychological Sciences
- Invision Power Services
- I Promise School, elementary school in Akron, Ohio

=== Other organizations ===
- Identity and Passport Service, United Kingdom
- Indian Police Service
- Insectivorous Plant Society, Japan
- Institute for Palestine Studies, Lebanon
- Institute for Politics and Society, Czech Republic
- Iraqi Police Service
- Irish Prison Service
- Israel Prison Service

== Other uses ==
- Interoperable Instant Payment System, a unified payment system in Bangladesh
- IPS Supported Employment, for people who have a severe mental illness
- Investment policy statement, stipulating how an investor's money is to be managed
- Institutional protection scheme, a mutual support arrangement in European banking
- International Parcel Service, a fictional delivery company featured on the sitcom The King of Queens
- Ipswich railway station, Suffolk, England (National Rail code: IPS)

== See also ==
- IPSS (disambiguation)
