= SX000i =

SX000i - International guide for the use of the S-Series of Integrated Logistics Support (ILS) specifications, is a specification developed jointly by a multinational team from the AeroSpace and Defence Industries Association of Europe (ASD) and Aerospace Industries Association (AIA). SX000i is part of the S-Series of ILS specifications.

SX000i provides information, guidance and instructions to ensure compatibility and the commonality of Integrated Logistics Support (ILS) processes among the S-Series suite of ILS specifications jointly developed by both associations.

By defining common logistics processes to be used across all S-Series ILS specifications and the interactions of the current S-Series ILS specifications with the logistics processes, the SX000i forms the basis for sharing and exchanging data securely through the life of products and services, not only within the support domain, but also with other domains such as Engineering. The SX000i also provides governance for the maintenance of current S-Series ILS specifications and the development of new S-Series ILS specifications.

SX000i builds on existing standards and specifications so as to provide a unified view of sometimes contradictory ILS specifications and publications. A reference and mapping of SX000i to these documents has been provided in Chapter 6.

== Purpose of the guide ==
SX000i provides a guide for the use of the S-series ILS specifications by ILS managers and practitioners, as well as for the management and future development of the specifications by the ILS Specification Council and ILS Specification Steering Committees (SC) and Working Groups (WG). SX000i:

- explains the vision and objectives for the suite of S-Series ILS specifications
- provides a framework that documents the global ILS process and interactions
- explains how the ASD/AIA S-Series ILS specifications interface with other standardization domains including program management, global supply chain management, engineering, manufacturing, security, safety, configuration management, quality, data exchange and integration, and life cycle cost
- describes the global governance of the S-Series ILS specifications development
- provides guidance on how to satisfy specific business requirements using an appropriate selection of defined processes and specifications

== SX000i development history ==
During the development of the S-Series ILS specifications, the different ASD/AIA Steering Committees and Working Groups identified the need for an "umbrella" specification to ensure the compatibility and commonality of ILS processes among the S-Series ILS specifications.

In 2011, the decision was made to develop, publicize and maintain an Integrated Logistics Support Guide, named SX000i, so as to provide a compatible and common ILS process to be used in the other S-Series ILS specifications. Development of SX000i was viewed by the ILS Specifications Council as an essential step to achieve the vision for the S-Series ILS specifications.

In June 2011, the SX000i working group was formed and SX000i development started. The current title of SX000i, International guide for the use of the S-Series of Integrated Logistics Support (ILS) specifications, was approved by the ASD/AIA ILS Specifications Council in June 2012.

Following the creation of the SX000i working group, the ASD/AIA Data Model and Exchange Working Group (DMEWG) was formed under the ILS Specifications Council in October 2011. Working in close cooperation with the SX000i team, the DMEWG coordinates the data modeling activities that are performed within the respective S-Series ILS Specification SCs and WGs so as to harmonize and consolidate data requirements into one coherent data model. Publication of SX000i, and continuing DMEWG coordination activities, enable the achievement of the vision for the suite of ILS specifications "to apply common logistics processes so as to share and exchange data securely through the life of products and services".

The companies and organizations that are currently participating in the development of SX000i are:

- Airbus (France)
- Airbus Defence and Space (Germany and Spain)
- Boeing Defence Systems (USA)
- Bundeswehr (Germany)
- Elektroniksystem- und Logistik-GmbH (ESG) (Germany)
- FACC AG (Austria)
- HEME GmbH (Germany)
- O’Neil (USA)
- Rockwell Collins
- Leonardo - Electronics, Defence & Security Systems (former Selex ES) (Italy)
- Turkish Aerospace Industries (TAI) (Turkey)
- Ministry of Defence (United Kingdom)

SX000i issue 1.0 was published in December 2015. An Issue 1.1 was published in July 2016.

The SX000i Steering Committee is currently co-chaired by the Spanish representative of Airbus Defence and Space, on behalf of ASD, and Boeing, on behalf of AIA.

== Intended use ==
SX000i is intended:

- To be a starting point for any potential users or new projects that would want to use the S-Series ILS specifications.
- To be an overview and coordinating document for all members of the international ILS community, engaged in the use and development of the S-Series ILS specifications on existing projects.

In that context, SX000i was developed for three primary applications:

- New Product development
- Support of existing Products
- ILS specification development and maintenance

== Target audiences ==
The target audiences for SX000i are:

=== Contractors ===
SX000i can be used by prime contractors, original equipment manufacturers, and suppliers as a reference for initially establishing their Product support strategies and plans, and selecting specifications to support those plans. SX000i can also be used to evaluate existing Product support strategies and projects.

=== Customers ===
SX000i can be used by customers to determine support requirements for new Products they are acquiring, or fielded Products for which they are seeking support, and to identify ILS specifications to be cited in solicitations.

=== ILS specifications Council ===
The ILS specifications Council uses SX000i to promote a commonality and interoperability among the S-Series ILS specifications.

=== ILS specification steering committees and working groups ===
Steering committees and working groups developing specifications use SX000i as a basis for describing relationships and interfaces between the ILS element(s) that their specification covers and:

- the other integrated logistic support elements
- the standardization domains

Steering committees use SX000i to ensure the compatibility of their specification with the other ILS specifications. The Data modeling and Exchange Working group (DMEWG) uses SX000i to harmonize and consolidate data requirements into one coherent data model supporting all of the ILS specifications. Steering committees and working groups both use SX000i to ensure compliance with ILS specification Council governance requirements.

== SX000i structure ==
SX000i consists of six chapters:

- Chapter 1, (Introduction) provides background information on the S-Series ILS specifications and SX000i.
- Chapter 2, (Integrated logistics support framework), documents a global ILS process and interactions at the ILS element level. This chapter establishes the foundation for the remainder of SX000i chapters and all of the S-Series ILS specifications.
- Chapter 3, (Use of the S-Series ILS specifications in an ILS project), explains how the S-Series ILS specifications relate to the global ILS process and elements, and how to use them as part of an ILS project.
- Chapter 4, (ILS specification governance), describes the structure of the S-Series ILS specifications organization and the processes used to manage the development and maintenance of those specifications. The target audience for this chapter is primarily the ILS specifications Council, and the SCs and WGs of the individual specifications.
- Chapter 5, (Terms, abbreviations and acronyms), provides the definition of the main terms used in this specification, as well as a list of all the abbreviations and acronyms.
- Chapter 6, (Comparison of specification terminology), provides a comparison of the terms, life cycle phases and ILS elements between SX000i and other international and military specifications, to enable users to better understand the underlying concepts.

== Availability ==
SX000i can be downloaded for free from its project website

== See also ==
- Integrated logistics support

== Associated specifications ==
The references below cover the specifications associated to the Integrated logistics support process described in SX000i, known as the ASD/AIA S-Series of ILS specifications:

- SX000i - International guide for the use of the S-Series of Integrated Logistics Support (ILS) specifications
- S1000D - International specification for technical publications using a common source database
- S2000M - International specification for materiel management - Integrated data processing
- S3000L - International specification for Logistics Support Analysis - LSA
- S4000P - International specification for developing and continuously improving preventive maintenance
- S5000F - International specification for in-service data feedback
- S6000T - International specification for training needs analysis - TNA (definition on-going)
- SX001G - Glossary for the Suite of S-specifications
- SX002D - Common Data Model
