= CSDB =

CSDB is an acronym that can stand for several different things:

- Colorado School for the Deaf and Blind
- Commercial Standard Digital Bus
- Common Source Data Base
- Central Securities Database
- Carbohydrate Structure Database
- Commodore 64 Scene Database
