= Jasc =

Jasc or JASC may refer to:

- Japan America Student Conference
- Jasc Software
- Joint Aircraft System/Component JASC Code. FAA and Joint Aviation Authority(European Civil Aviation Conference) code table for printed and electronic manuals. See ATA 100
- Jewish Agricultural Settlement Corporation (JASC), the American branch of the German settlement organization Juedische Landarbeit GmbH
