= S4000P =

Specification in aerospace engineering

S4000P - International specification for developing and continuously improving preventive maintenance is a specification developed jointly by a multinational team from the AeroSpace and Defence Industries Association of Europe (ASD) and Aerospace Industries Association (AIA). S4000P is part of the S-Series of ILS specifications and is integrated in the global ILS process defined by SX000i - International guide for the use of the S-Series of Integrated Logistics Support (ILS) specifications.

The main purpose of this specification is to assist all parties, including regulatory authorities, involved in the analysis process developing and releasing initial PMTR and intervals for new products prior entry into service. S4000P analysis methodologies remain applicable for later optimizations/modifications of the product design and/or of product structure and/or of product zones. Once developed, authorized and packaged into interval clusters in a product OMP, the S4000P In-Service Maintenance Optimization (ISMO) process enables continuously improving product maintenance during its in-service phase.

Every development or improvement of a preventive maintenance task requirement for a product supports at least one of the following aspects:

- ensure/maintain product safety, including safety/emergency systems and/or emergency equipment
- avoid any conflict with law and/or significant impact on environmental integrity (ecological damage) during product mission/operation and/or maintenance
- optimize mission/operational capability/availability of the Product
- optimize product economy (Life Cycle Costs = LCC)

== Rationale for S4000P ==
For a new product or for a new product variant, the maintainability of the intended product design must be assessed by maintainability specialists providing engineering support. Accumulated in-service experience with other products must also be taken into account. In parallel to the product design process, Preventive Maintenance Task Requirements (PMTR) with intervals and/or redesign requirements must be assessed on an analytical basis and be determined if applicable and effective. Results must be available prior to product development milestones, latest prior to the Critical Design Review (CDR) for the product.

According to the overall ASD scope, the specification S4000P must cover all types of products including any complex technical platform, system, equipment or facility (e.g. on air/sea/land, under the sea-/ground-level, in space). The S4000P analysis methodologies allow a structured, traceable and complete determination of PMTR with intervals for a product, which become the basis to elaborate and document a product maintenance program/Operators' Maintenance Program (OMP) prior to starting the product in-service phase.

During the product in-service phase, S4000P provides an additional process that allows reviewing the completeness and effectiveness of preventive maintenance tasks from a product OMP, taking into account product in-service experience and the state-of-the-art analysis methodologies. Such a review of the OMP is to be fully traceable and applicable for all products types.

Every S4000P analysis methodology or process must be tailored for the product under analysis in an analysis guideline or handbook to be acceptable to regulatory authorities (if involved), maintainers, operators, manufacturers and suppliers.

== S4000P main advantages and innovations ==
S4000P builds on the know-how accumulated over many years on different maintenance analysis techniques such as Reliability-centered maintenance but has simplified and extended to those methodologies:

- In comparison to other known analysis methodologies, the application of ASD S4000P is not limited to any pre-defined product type, like military or civil aircraft only. The S4000P analysis principles are developed by industry to be applicable to any complex technical product. This comprises products in air, on ground, under the ground, on sea, under the sea level or even in space for civil and/or military usage.
- To cover the whole product life cycle, S4000P provides the innovative ISMO methodology to prove and optimize the product maintenance during its complete in-service life. This is in addition to the product maintainability analysis that has to take place during the design and development phase to provide engineering/design support.
- When defining preventive maintenance task requirements, the S4000P product system analysis takes into account product-integrated test- and condition monitoring technology being widely used in modern products.
- The S4000P product structure analysis covers all kind of existing and future product structure materials and material combinations.
- The S4000P product zonal analysis is based on a modular analysis concept to cover the zonal analysis of all kind of product types.

== S4000P development ==
S4000P development work started in 2013.

European experts from the following international companies and organizations have participated in the developed S4000P:

- Airbus Defence and Space (Germany/Spain)
- Airbus Helicopters (Germany/France)
- BAE Systems (United Kingdom)
- Dassault Aviation France
- Logistics Command of the Bundeswehr (Germany)
- LSC Group Ltd. (United Kingdom)
- Ministry of Defence (United Kingdom)
- Saab Group (Sweden)

Issue 1.0 (current issue) was published in May 2014.

== Availability ==
S4000P can be downloaded for free from its project website
