= Soraya Bahgat =

Egyptian women's rights advocate (born 1983)

- Occupations: Activist, events manager

Soraya Bahgat (born 1983) is a Finnish-Egyptian social entrepreneur, gender equality activist and women's rights advocate. Primarily active in Egypt, she spent part of her childhood in Finland and now lives between Egypt and Finland.

While working as Head of HR in 2012, she founded Tahrir Bodyguard, a grass-roots movement of uniformed volunteers, to protect women from mob sexual assaults in Tahrir Square in the wake of Egypt's 2011 revolution. The movement successfully intervened to rescue over 100 women and girls and, and offered free self-defense classes for women at several locations in Cairo.

She often speaks and comments on women's issues at events and in the media. In 2019, the Finnish Government granted her the Hän Honor for her work combatting gender-based violence and promoting gender equality.

== Tahrir Bodyguard ==
Soraya Bahgat decided to launch Tahrir Bodyguard following a panic attack that she experienced after hearing about the brutal mob sexual assaults in Tahrir Square. Recognizing the power of Twitter, she immediately took to the site to start an account and started tweeting safety tips and calls for volunteers.

She started by purchasing 200 uniforms comprising construction helmets and neon vests and soon enough the group managed to recruit the needed volunteers. The volunteers' uniforms comprising construction helmets and neon vests were intended to protect the volunteers and make them easily visible at night.

The group stated that it patrolled Tahrir Square and its surroundings and tried to free women being assaulted and take them to ambulances stationed outside the square.

At the beginning, she was anonymous and gave an interview to Gawker in December 2012 using a pseudonym. In February 2013, her name and occupation were revealed in a profile by the Associated Press.

During down times where there was no activity in Tahrir Square, the group offered free self-defense classes for women to empower them to own the streets.

== Women’s Advocacy and Community Engagement ==
She is a member of the Strategic Advisory Group of The Girl Generation, the Africa-led movement to end female genital mutilation in one generation. Italian-Egyptian model, actress and philanthropist Elisa Sednaoui has named her as a friend and collaborator on her foundation's website. In 2014, Soraya became one of the nonprofit organization's trustees promoting creative learning through special after-school programs for disadvantaged youngsters in Egypt and other countries. Between 2008 and 2012, she served on the board of the Gezira Youth Center.

== Public appearances ==
Together with her Tahrir Bodyguard colleagues she appeared in a France 24 documentary by French journalist Sonia Dridi entitled “Sexual harassment, an Egyptian disease". The documentary which included interviews with Mona Eltahawy and other Egyptian activists closely followed the Tahrir Bodyguard team during their preparations and as they patrolled the vicinity of Tahrir Square.

In March 2013, Soraya appeared alongside Harassmap’s Ebaa El-Tamami in a special episode of the widely popular show Al Bernameg hosted by Bassem Youssef . The episode was fully dedicated to tackling the issue of sexual harassment of women in Egypt and utilized humor and satire to dispel many of the misconceptions about the topic, especially those that place the blame on women. In May 2013, Soraya gave a speech on women in Egypt at the Oslo Freedom Forum entitled “The voice of a woman is a revolution”. In her speech she described the courage that women showed in protesting alongside men during the Egyptian Revolution of 2011 and denounced the attacks and harassment they have faced since then. She also highlighted the pandemic of mob sexual assaults in Tahrir Square and the various efforts by civilians to combat these assaults. “We’re putting up a fight, we’re not afraid,” she said. “When they tried to silence Egyptian women, we became even more defiant.” Following her speech, she participated in a panel discussion entitled "women under threat” that also included Lebanese journalist Jenan Moussa, British journalist and barrister Afua Hirsch and co-founder and assistant executive director of the Panzi Foundation USA Lee Ann De Reus. The panel discussion was moderated by BBC television Newsreader and journalist Philippa Thomas.

== Honors and awards ==
In March 2024, she was awarded a Champions of Change Award at a joint ceremony held by the embassies of Canada, Czech Republic, France, Germany, Sweden and Mexico.

In September 2015, she was one of 22 young Arab leaders selected for the German Bundestag’s International Parliamentary Scholarship program

In April 2015, she was chosen as one of 22 Mediterranean women leaders of the future by Sciences Po and the French government.

In March 2014, she was chosen as one of the mentees in the Fortune Magazine/ US State Department Global Women's Mentoring Partnership held in collaboration with Vital Voices.

== Education ==
Soraya is a graduate of the American University in Cairo. She also studied at the University of Helsinki
