= S1000D =

Specification on publishing technical information

Logo S1000D

S1000D is an international specification for the procurement and production of technical publications. It is an XML specification for preparing, managing, and publishing technical information for a product. It was initially developed by the AeroSpace and Defence Industries Association of Europe (ASD) for use with military aircraft. Since Issue 2 the scope has been extended to include land, sea and even non-equipment products. It is widely used in civil as well as military products. S1000D is part of the S-Series of ILS specifications.

S1000D is maintained by the S1000D Steering Committee, which includes board members from AeroSpace and Defence Industries Association of Europe (ASD), the United States' Aerospace Industries Association (AIA), and the Air Transport Association (ATA), along with industry and defence representatives from most of the countries currently using the specification. The specification is free to download and use, although commercial products and services are available.

== Main principles ==
S1000D requires information to be created as individual data items, called data modules (DM), which are structured with XML elements and metadata. Each DM is self-contained and may be used wherever that piece of information is needed. They are organised into an hierarchical XML structure through the use of data module coding. This permits the updating of single data items without necessarily changing the path in the XML structure which points to them. Knowledge so partitioned and classified can therefore be shared among many publications, and updating of items in the underlying controlled source will automatically affect updating of the dependent publications. The actual XML hierarchy must be designed specifically for each different knowledge domain.

The DMs and supporting contents (graphics, multimedia, publishing information, training packages, etc.) are usually stored and maintained using a Common Source Data Base (CSDB). This is the database for the containment and management of data modules. The CSDB will typically contain all the components required for a product's Interactive Electronic Technical Publication (IETP) - which is all the elements required across all disciplines for the production of a suite of documentation for the operation and maintenance of the product. S1000D only states that there must be a database, it does not define the functionality.

Another common term often related to S1000D is Interactive Electronic Technical Manual (IETM) which is usually considered as an individual manual that is part of the IETP. Due to the flexibility of XML, these IETM may range from a printed (paper or simple page-presentation) manual, through to a fully interactive digital manual with rich media, learning opportunities, and multiple formats of delivery.

== Associated specifications ==
S1000D is part of the S-Series of ILS specifications. There is an interface specification with S3000L Issue 1.0, titled S1003X

For S1000D content in English, the language should adhere to Simplified Technical English standard ASD-STE100.

== Availability ==
S1000D can be downloaded for free at its project website .

== History ==
Prior to Issue 2, updates to the specification were known as changes. When the standard reached Change 9, the proposed Change 10 became Issue 2.0 with previous Changes retro-referred to as Issue 1.x. Issue 1.6 was the first publicly published version of S1000D and was notable as the first issue to include operator information (Crew) as well as maintainer content.

Change history of S1000D
| Issue | Date | Base language | Amendments |
|---|---|---|---|
| 1.6 | 31 March 1995 | SGML DTD not available for download | |
| 1.7 | 02 January 1998 | SGML DTD | 1.7.1 dated 2 July 1998 (introduces IPRF DTD) |
| 1.8 | 31 January 1999 | SGML DTD | 1.8.1 dated 31 May 2000 (various DTD changes) |
| 1.9 | 01 April 2001 | SGML/XML DTD | |
| 2.0 | 31 May 2003 | SGML/XML DTD, XML schema | There is a patch folder, but no official numbered patch and it only contains an updated data dictionary. |
| 2.1 | 29 February 2004 | SGML/XML DTD, XML schema | |
| 2.2 | 01 May 2005 | SGML/XML DTD, XML schema | 2.2.1 dated 01 May 2006 (XML schema only) |
| 2.3 | 28 February 2007 | SGML/XML DTD, XML schema | 2.3.1 dated 01 February 2009 (various schema problems fixed) |
| 3.0 | 31 July 2007 | SGML/XML DTD, XML schema | 3.0.1 dated 01 February 2009 (various schema problems fixed) |
| 4.0 | 01 August 2008 | XML schema | 4.0.1 dated 12 May 2009 (extensive changes, updated BREX) 4.0.2 dated 09 October 2013 (various changes, updated BREX) |
| 4.1 | 31 December 2012 | XML schema | 4.1.A dated 7 November 2014 (corrects error in Crew schema, IPD fig number and BREX problems) 4.1.B dated 30 June 2017 (updated BREX rules) 4.1.C dated 12 May 2020 (adds back missing Warning and Caution CIR infoCodes) 4.1.D dated 27 April 2023 (replaced .swf files in Bike data with .gif) |
| 4.2 | 31 December 2016 | XML schema | 4.2.A dated 31 May 2019 (specification only; no schema changes) |
| 5.0 | 28 June 2019 | XML schema | 5.0.A dated 01 November 2019 (specification only; no schema changes) 5.0.B dated 29 September 21 (data dictionary update only) |
| 6 | 01 September 2024 | XML Schema | |
| 7 | 16 July 2026 | XML Schema | |

== Software ==
S1000D provides guidelines on functionality that should be expected to be found in tools such as a Common Source Data Base, and IETM/IETP. However, S1000D does not provide, nor endorse, any software tools to produce or distribute content in accordance with the standard.

== See also ==
- ATA 100
- IETM/IETP
- Common Source Data Base
