= Network Centric Product Support =

Network Centric Product Support (NCPS) is an early application of an Internet of Things (IoT) computer architecture developed to leverage new information technologies and global networks to assist in managing maintenance, support and supply chain of complex products made up of one or more complex systems, such as in a mobile aircraft fleet or fixed location assets such as in building systems. This is accomplished by establishing digital threads connecting the physical deployed subsystem with its design Digital Twins virtual model by embedding intelligence through networked micro-web servers that also function as a computer workstation within each subsystem component (i.e. Engine control unit on an aircraft) or other controller and enabling 2-way communications using existing Internet technologies and communications networks - thus allowing for the extension of a product lifecycle management (PLM) system into a mobile, deployed product at the subsystem level in real time. NCPS can be considered to be the support flip side of Network-centric warfare, as this approach goes beyond traditional logistics and aftermarket support functions by taking a complex adaptive system management approach and integrating field maintenance and logistics in a unified factory and field environment. Its evolution began out of insights gained by CDR Dave Loda (USNR) from Network Centric Warfare-based fleet battle experimentation at the US Naval Warfare Development Command (NWDC) in the late 1990s, who later lead commercial research efforts of NCPS in aviation at United Technologies Corporation. Interaction with the MIT Auto-ID Labs, EPCglobal, the Air Transport Association of America ATA Spec 100/iSpec 2200 and other consortium pioneering the emerging machine to machine Internet of Things (IoT) architecture contributed to the evolution of NCPS.

== Purpose ==
Simply put, this architecture extends the existing World Wide Web infrastructure of networked web servers down into the product at its subsystem's controller level using a Systems Engineering "system of systems" nested approach. Its core is an embedded dual function webserver/computer workstation connected to the product controller's test ports (as used in retrofit applications, or integrated directly into the controller for new products), hence providing access to operational cycles, sensor and other information in a clustered, internet addressable node that allows for local or remote access, and the ability to host remotely reconfigurable software that can collect and process data from its mated subsystem controller onboard and pull in other computing resources throughout the network. It can then establish a localized wireless World Wide Web in and around the product that can be securely connected to by a mechanic with any web browser-equipped handheld independent of the greater World Wide Web, as well as seamlessly integrate into global networks when external wireless communications is available - thus creating data Digital Twins at the factory, connecting deployed product usage in the Product lifecycle with constantly updated digital threads. This allows for an integrated approach which enables both offline and online updates to occur. Legacy systems usually require a human to physically connect a laptop to the system controller or a telematic solution to manually collect data and carry it back to a location where it can be later transferred to the factory or to restricted webserver-based download sites for offboard analysis.

The architecture also enables communications with other micro-webservers in its Computer cluster (i.e. in an aircraft), or to higher level clusters (such as an internet portal managed fleet and flight operations managers), thus enabling access to data resources and personnel and factory engineers at remote office computers through the World Wide Web. As stated previously, the system operates asynchronously, in that it does not have to be always connected to the World Wide Web to function; rather it simply operates locally, then synchronizes two-way information relevant to the subsystem, acting as a Gateway (telecommunications) on board that connects with other gateways within the network, which can be airborne or on the ground, on an as-needed basis when communications is available. This can be accomplished through a wireless LAN, satellite, cellular network or other wireless or wired communications capabilities.

Security of the network is critical, and the architecture can utilize standard web security protocols, from Public-key cryptography to embedded hardware encryption devices.

== Typical Usage ==
The extension of the World Wide Web architecture into the product is important to understand, as all decisions for manufacturing of spare parts, scheduling for flights, and other factory OEM and airline operator functions, are driven primarily by what happens to the product in the field (rate of wear and impending failure, primarily). Predicting the rate of wear, and hence the impact on operations and forecasting for producing spare parts in the future, is critical for optimizing operations for all involved. Managing a complex system such as a fleet of aircraft, vehicles or fixed location products can be accomplished in this manner. For example, coupled with technologies such as RFID, the system could track parts from the factory to the aircraft on board, then continue to read the configuration of the subsystem’s replaceable tagged parts, map their configuration to hours run and duty cycles, then process/communicate the projected wear rate through the World Wide Web back to the operator or factory. In this way mechanical wear rates and future failures can be predicted more accurately and the forecasting of spare parts manufacturing and shipment can be significantly improved. This is called Prognostics Health Monitoring (PHM), which has become possible in recent years with the advent of electronic controllers, and is a recent evolutionary step in aircraft support and maintenance management that began as individual processes prior to World War II and solidified into a manual tracking system to support aircraft fleets in the Korean War. Support for the mechanic comes in local wireless access to technical information stored and remotely updated on board the micro-webserver component relevant to that product, such as service bulletins, factory updates, fault code driven, intelligent 3D computer game-like maintenance procedures, and social media applications for sharing of product issues and maintenance procedure improvements in the field to include collaborative 2-way voice, text and image communications. Note that this architecture can be utilized on any system that requires monitoring and trending, to include mobile medical applications for monitoring functionality of human systems when the subject is equipped with data sensors.

== Background and Other Examples ==
The original micro-webserver component (i. e. the onboard unit) that is key to enabling the NCPS architecture was first prototyped and demonstrated in 2001 by David Loda, Enzo Macchia, Sam Quadri and Bjorn Stickling at United Technologies' Pratt & Whitney division and initially tested on board a Fairchild-Dornier 328 (later AvCraft 328) regional jet in January 2002. It was introduced to the public and demonstrated at the Farnborough Air Show in July 2002 in prototype form and again in 2004 as a flight certified product offering marketed by United Technologies as the DTU and later FAST data management units for service in a number of aircraft and helicopter fleets.

A similar complex systems approach in a completely different application is successfully embodied in the Eisenhower Interstate Highway System, though what is transported in NCPS is information, not cars and trucks. Network Centric Product Support, or net-centric product support, is an architectural concept, and merely connects the major avenues already existing in global communications and the internet down into the mobile product, extending maintenance and supply chain processes into an integrated product centric system with a real time feedback loop to the designers, factory and maintainers as to product performance and reliability. For example, to gain information about a particular engine on a mobile aircraft, it is most efficient to send the inquiry to the engine directly and host all information generated and relevant to that system there, as well synchronize in a twin remote database for access and queuing when the engine system is not in communications. Other examples where this can be applied include shipping containers, automobiles, spacecraft, appliances, human medical monitoring, or any other complex product with sensors and subsystems that require maintenance support and monitoring.

Many organizations are beginning to see the value of a netcentric (also spelled "net-centric") approach to managing complex systems, including the Network Centric Operations Industry Consortium (NCOIC), which is an association of leading aerospace and defense contractors in the Network Centric Warfare arena. Network Centric thinking for aircraft operations, including Network Enabled Operations (NEO) demonstrations, also figure prominently in the commercial Next Generation Air Transportation System (NextGen) approach being made by the US Government to revamping air transportation management in the 21st century.
