= Regional Airline Association =

US airline trade association

- Formation: 1975; 51 years ago
- Headquarters: Washington, D.C.
- Services: Advocacy group
- Methods: Lobbying
- Fields: Aviation
- President: Faye Malarkey Black
- Vice President: Stacey Bechdolt
- Website: raa.org

The Regional Airline Association (RAA) is a business association founded in 1975 that represents 17 North American regional airlines and 280 associate, non-airline members. This includes manufacturers of products and services supporting the regional airline industry. The RAA is the collective bargaining voice for its members' interests and lobbies on their behalf before the United States Congress, Department of Transportation, Federal Aviation Administration and other federal agencies. The RAA represents the financial and economic interests of regional airline employers and regional airline support industry employers. The Regional Airline Association does not represent financial or economic interest of airline employees, either union or other. The RAA is headquartered in Washington, D.C.

== Member airlines ==
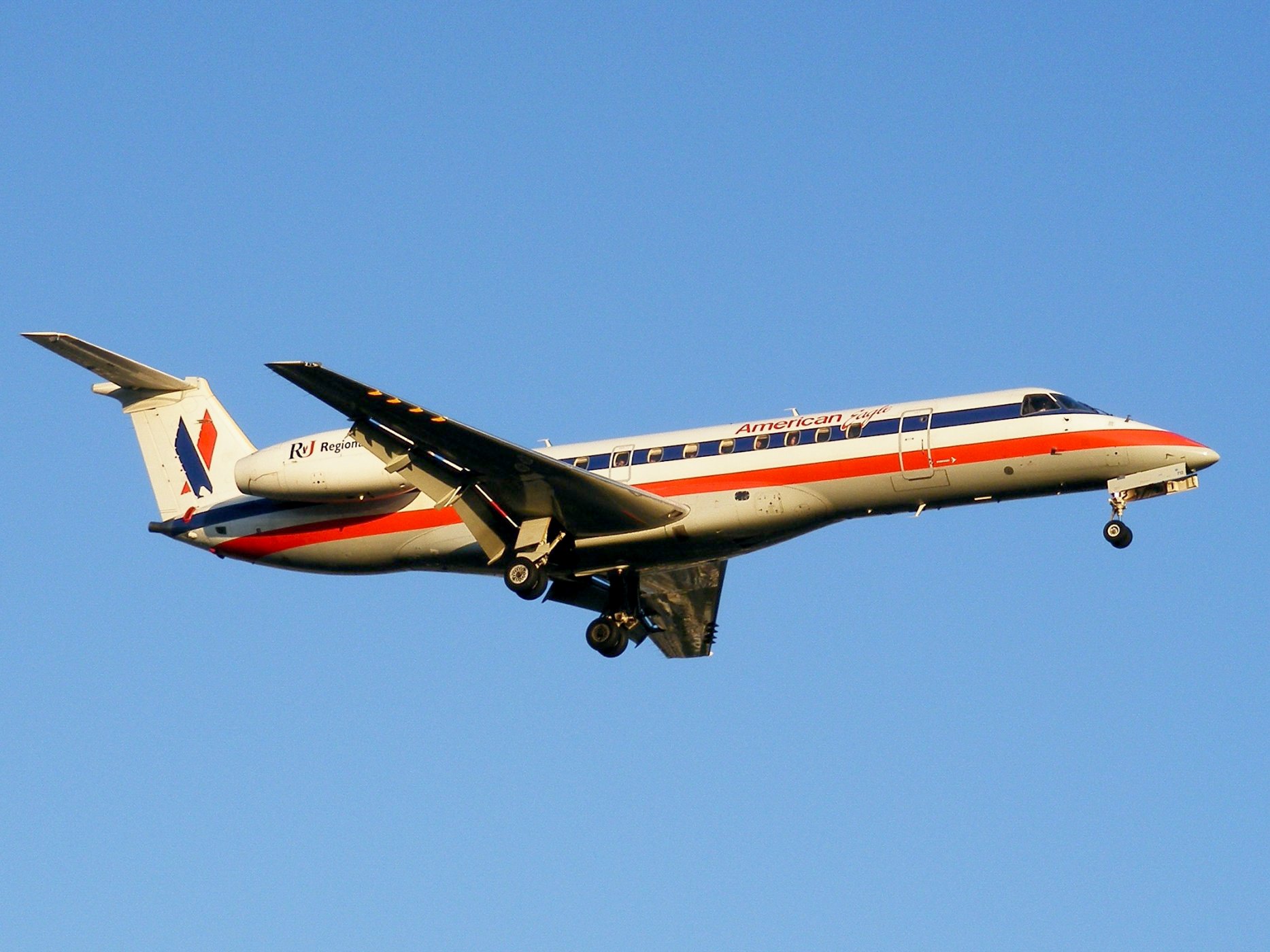
A former (MQ) American Eagle Airlines now (MQ) Envoy Air EMB-145, RAA member

As of September 2026, the Regional Airline Association includes 13 members.

- Cape Air (listed as Hyannis Air Service)
- CommuteAir
- Empire Airlines
- Endeavor Air
- Envoy Air
- GoJet
- Horizon Air
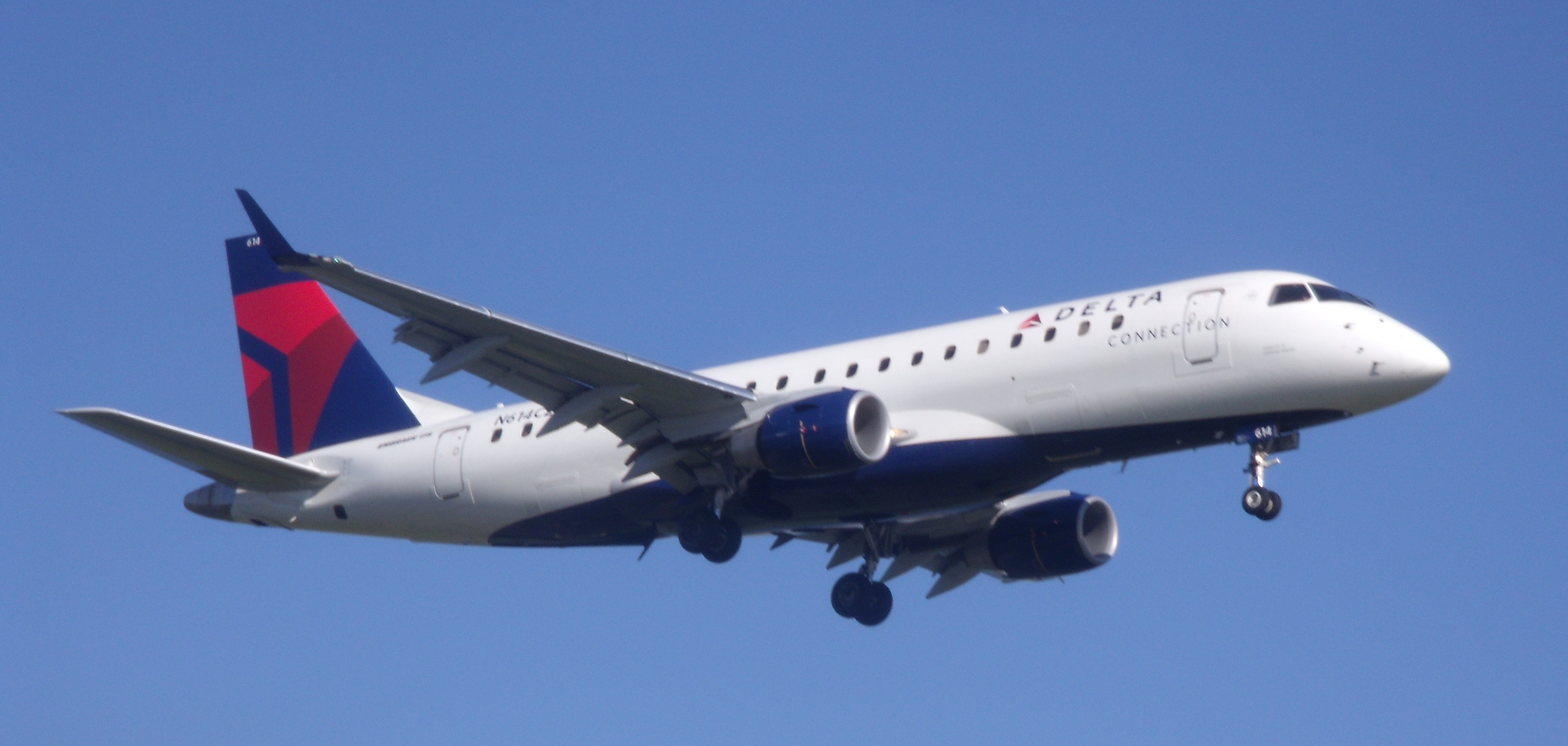
  EMB-175 of Shuttle America (Subsidiary of Republic Airways), RAA member
- Mesa Air Group
- New England Airlines
- Piedmont Airlines
- PSA Airlines
- Republic Airline
- SkyWest Airlines

== Recent notable positions ==
=== "Take-off Tax" ===
In 2011, the RAA opposed President Obama's recent bill to add a $100 tax to each Part 121 (Regularly Scheduled Airline) and each Part 135 (Charter) flight in the USA. Roger Cohen, president of the RAA stated,

"This tax would place the heaviest burden on regional airlines that provide the only source of scheduled air service to over 75 percent of the nation's airports. This jeopardizes air service to some 500 U.S. communities relying on regional airlines exclusively for their scheduled flights. Make no mistake. This tax jeopardizes air service at places where air service is the only link to the global economy, putting smaller communities out of business."

The bill did not pass.

=== Enhancing Airline Passenger Protections ===
The final rule, which was published on April 25, 2011, as 76 Federal Regulation 23110, includes raising the minimum "denied boarding compensation" to customers with valid tickets yet still not allowed to board the aircraft. The legislation further penalizes airlines up to $27,500 a passenger if left stranded aboard an aircraft, on a tarmac for more than three hours. In 2010, the Regional Airline Association and all of its member airlines opposed this legislation stating that they could regulate themselves and they already had begun implementing systems by which to mitigate any tarmac delays. Later American Eagle, an RAA airline member, was the first airline to be fined under the new legislation. A total settlement including fines and compensation paid to passengers totaled $800,000 for tarmac delays incurred in Chicago in May 2011.

=== 1500 Hour Pilot Rule (HR 5900) ===
When the bill passed in 2010, the minimum required hours for a pilot to serve as a first officer (co-pilot) in an airline transport capacity was 250 hours. In July 2013, HR 5900 increased this requirement to 1500 hours and possession of an Airline Transport Certificate (ATP). Prior to this, a first officer only needed a Commercial Certificate, while the captain was required to have their ATP. Then Senior Vice President of the RAA, Scott Foose has commented before the Federal Aviation Association that he didn't think the rule had relevance since, as he commented, both of the pilots involved in the crash of Continental Express 3407, which the legislation was inspired by, had over 1500 hours. Foose argued that HR 5900's clause allowing for academic substitution of flight experience should be invoked. Foose said,

The FAA has, through the rule-making process, the opportunity to amend the ATP standards to allow for academic credit in lieu of some flight time. Unless the FAA's new rule recognizes the value of some of the new academic flight training programs, we'll see a decrease in the pilot supply. It's not just a safety issue. It is also about diminishing service to communities that are receiving scheduled air service today.

Earlier in 2010 however, Cohen, the former RAA president, didn't seem to have those concerns, shortage or not. When addressing the concern of growing disinterest in the occupation of airline pilot, due to both the new 1500 hour rule and plummeting pilot pay, the RAA president stated "We're confident our members will be able to navigate any perceived or real pilot shortage, just like we have done historically."

== Controversy ==
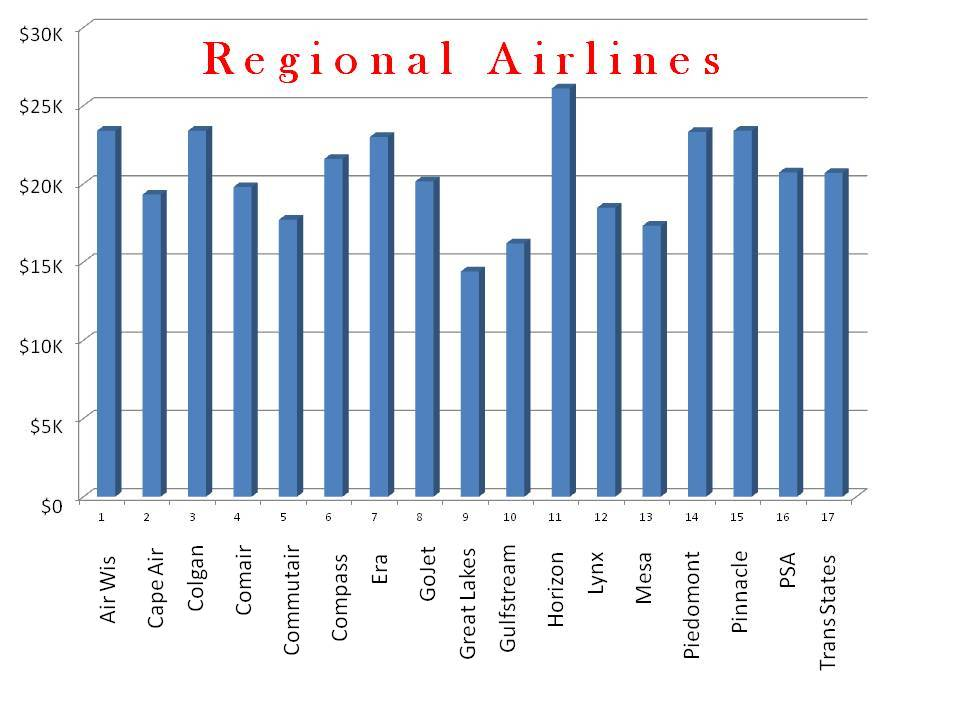
First year regional pilot pay as of Aug. 2011. Source AirlinePilotCentral.com, an industry career site.

In recent years the regional airlines are coming under intense scrutiny both from the public and the media. In his film Capitalism: A Love Story, director and film producer Michael Moore profiled how little most regional pilots are paid in the first few years of their careers. Although the industry average starting pay is around $21 per flight hour, hourly wages for regional pilots start at $12.50 an hour. In comparison, a cabbie in New York averages $17 an hour, according to that city's Taxi & Limousine Commission. On Feb 12th, 2010, a year after the crash of Continental Express/Colgan flight 3407, Frontline premiered its WGA Award winning exposè on the industry entitled "Flying Cheap". In it, journalist Miles O'Brien questioned the impact such low salaries are having on pilot psyches and how safe this could be for the flying public. When asked to respond to an $18,000 a year first year starting pay Roger Cohen, former president of the Regional Airline Association, said "There are many other people who earn less money than that and work more days in these communities that can afford it and do it and do it responsibly."

== See also ==
- Airlines for America
