= IPSS =

IPSS may refer to:

== Medicine ==
- Inferior petrosal sinus sampling, a procedure to help distinguish types of Cushing's disease
- International Prognostic Scoring System, an evaluation method to determine the severity of myelodysplastic syndrome
- International Prostate Symptom Score, a short questionnaire to help screen for benign prostatic hyperplasia (BPH)

== Other ==
- Infrasonic passive seismic spectroscopy, a geological exploration and monitoring technique
- International Packet Switched Service, a telecommunications data transmission protocol
- Institute for Peace and Security Studies, a university in Ethiopia

== See also ==
- IPS (disambiguation)
