= Propellants, Explosives, Pyrotechnics =

- Discipline: Chemistry
- Language: English

Publication details
- Former name(s): Propellants and Explosives
- History: 1976–present
- Publisher: Wiley-VCH
- Frequency: Monthly
- Open access: Hybrid
- Impact factor: 2.134 (2021)

Standard abbreviations
- ISO 4: Propellants Explos. Pyrotech.

Indexing
- CODEN: PEPYD5
- ISSN: 0721-3115 (print); 1521-4087 (web)
- OCLC no.: 909877372

Links
- Journal homepage; Online access; Online archive

Propellants, Explosives, Pyrotechnics is a monthly peer-reviewed scientific journal covering all aspects of research on explosives. It was established in 1976 by Hiltmar Schubert and was intended as a successor to Explosivstoffe, a journal which had appeared between 1953 and 1975 but which had been published exclusively in German. It has been the official journal of the International Pyrotechnics Society since 1982 and is published by Wiley-VCH. The types of papers published by the journal are full papers, communications, and reviews, and a section containing news, obituaries, book reviews, and conference reports. The editors-in-chief are Randall L. Simpson (Lawrence Livermore National Laboratory), Wilhelm Eckl (Fraunhofer Institute for Chemical Technology), and Richard Gee (Lawrence Livermore National Laboratory).

According to the Journal Citation Reports, the journal has a 2021 impact factor of 2.134.
