= Interactive electronic technical manual =

An Interactive Electronic Technical Manual (IETM) is a platform to consume and sometimes manage technical documentation. IETMs compress volumes of text into just CD-ROMs or online pages which may include sound and video, and allow readers to locate needed information far more rapidly than in paper manuals. IETMs came into widespread use in the 1990s as technical documentation projects for the aircraft and defense industries grew rapidly and became unmanageable as paper-based publications.

== History ==
In the United States, in the late 1970s, the US Military began to look at other ways to produce technical manuals. With the introduction of computer technology it was theorized that moving technical manuals to an electronic format would obtain a cost savings, allow better integration with other logistics systems and improve usability of the technical material.

Research was performed in the 1970s and 1980s by all branches of the US military to obtain information on what the goals should be for the electronic technical manuals. Early research was conducted at the Army Communicative Technology Office at Ft. Eustis, the Air Force Human Resources Laboratory (now called Armstrong Laboratory) at Wright-Patterson Air Force Base, and the David Taylor Research Center (now called Naval Surface Warfare Center, Carderock Division) in Bethesda, Maryland. Programs developed by the Navy, Navy Technical Information Presentation System (NTIPS) and the Air Force, Computer-based Maintenance Aid System (CMAS), were used along with user surveys, technological analysis and design studies to come up with the basic concepts for IETMs. Based on field tests with technicians maintaining military equipment, the tests found that performance was greatly improved and dramatic improvement occurred for inexperienced technicians. One questionnaire found that 90% of the technicians preferred electronic manuals and found them easier to use.

Other examples of the improvements from IETMs included:

- Navy - 100% of the technicians, experience and inexperienced, found a fault when using electronic material compared to 58% when the technicians used paper manuals
- Air Force - 100% fault isolation for experience and inexperienced technicians using electronic material compared to 75% success rate when using paper

Because of the positive results, the Department of Defense identified the need for standardization of the IETM development. In 1987 a joint military and commercial group was formed consisting of the Office of the Secretary of Defense Computer-assisted Acquisition and Logistics Support (OSD CALS) and Aerospace Industries Association (AIA). This group developed concepts for IETM authoring, IETM presentation and data interchange which were used as the basis for standard development. In 1989 the US Navy, Air Force and Army formed an ad-hoc group to determine the best way to create standards for IETMS. Input from the use of NTIPS and CMAS, later renamed Integrated Maintenance Information System(IMIS), were used along with input from the CALS Industry Steering Group (ISG) Paperless Technical Manual Committee, the Navy A-12 Program, The Air Force ATF Program, and the Army PMDE Program's IETM Style Guide as a starting point for a working group for IETM standards. The group came out with the first formally issued set of standards in 1992. By 1994, Senior R&D Engineer Michael Weldon, working on behalf of LORAL Corporation, developed a demonstration White Paper IETM describing the use of an IETM utilizing an eyeglass Monitor interfaced with a portable belt mounted CD Player for hands free use by technicians in the field, i.e. as when working on a tower 60 feet AGL.

The Tri-Service group came up with three standards:

- MIL-M-87268. Manuals, Interactive Electronic Technical: General Content, Style, Format, and User-Interaction Requirements For.
- MIL-D-87269. Data Base, Revisable: Interactive Electronic Technical Manuals, For The Support Of.
- MIL-Q-87270. Quality Assurance (QA) Program: Interactive Electronic Technical Manuals (IETMs) and Associated Technical Information, Requirements For.

The Tri-Service Group also came up with a roadmap that went through to 1997 for revision of the standards and the creation of documentation explaining the standards.

== IETM vs IETP ==
A synonymous term for IETM is Interactive Electronic Technical Publication (IETP) and whilst some would say one is a single manual and the other a suite of publications, in reality this is not true. The difference in definition is more of geography or route into electronic documentation. With the standard being first defined in the USA as IETM, understandably the Americas mostly use that term. It is also widespread in Asia and particularly India. However, those nations that come more from an S1000D background tend to use IETP - so this is largely Europe, and emerging nations new to electronic publications.

== The Classes of Electronic Technical Manuals ==
The ETM classes defined by the Tri-Service IETM Working Group are as follows. Note, Class 0 is included for completeness to define a full spectrum; and Class 5 is intentionally left open ended to include future innovations not yet available.

- Class 0. Non-Electronically-Indexed Page Images [Not an ETM] - Systems of Digitized Page Images that are intended for electronic archival filing or Print-on-Demand. These allow pages to be viewed on an electronic display but have no detailed index for navigation through the document for the purpose of on-line usage.
- Class 1. Electronically Indexed Page Images - Systems of Digitized Page Images intended for Full-Page Display and use allowing navigation by means of an automated intelligent index to the page images for user access (e.g., Navy Advanced Technical Information System - ATIS). These systems can be used in a library or reference setting for reading and research use.
- Class 2. Electronic Scrolling Documents - Systems for Interactive Display of ASCII-Encoded Documents using an intelligent index and Hypertext tags inserted into a tagged document file. In general, the document is the result of a simple conversion from a page-oriented document but with little or no reauthoring by a subject matter expert with the exception of adding hypertext tags. These allow a user to navigate through the document, but have very limited, if any, author inserted navigation aids or a content-driven "NEXT" function.
- Class 3. Linear Structured IETMs - Interactive Display of Technical Information which is SGML tagged using MIL-D-87269 tags to the maximum extent possible and using a Hypertext presentation system for display in accordance with MIL-M-87268. It is based on a linear SGML document file and not a hierarchically based Data Base. Navigation is based on author developed constructs employing features such as prompted dialog boxes and content driven logical "NEXT" function.
- Class 4. Hierarchically Structured IETMs - Interactive Electronic Display of Technical Information specifically authored into and maintained in a nonredundant relational or object-oriented hierarchical data base. These source data are subsequently packaged (i.e., "view-packaged") as a run-time data base for Interactive Presentation in accordance with the DoD IETM Specifications (MIL-M-87268, MIL-D-87269, and MIL-Q-87270). This class differs from Class 3 largely in the manner in which the source data is managed. The user presentation may be very similar.
- Class 5. Integrated Data-Base IETIS - Integrated Electronic Technical Information System (IETIS) for Interactive Presentation of Class 4 IETMs integrated with the data for other processes, including Expert-System rules for the display of information and other user-applications such as diagnostics or computer-managed training. This Class is intended to include future applications and features not yet developed or sufficiently mature for production use.

=== What makes an ETM an IETM? ===
To be called an IETM, the ETM must have extensive provision for the authoring activity to include authored interactive features into the IETM (e.g., prompts, dialogs for obtaining data from a user, alternative branches which the user must choose). There are two classes of IETMs: Class 4 which fully conforms to the IETM Specifications and includes a DBMS-managed formal database for the IETM Revisable Source Data; and Class 3 which does not fully conform to Class 4 (especially in the use of a revisable database for the source data) but has many of the features of a Class 4 IETM. To the end user, Class 3 and Class 4 IETMs may appear to be the functional equivalent; however, the source data management system used to prepare them will be substantially different. Class 5 is a functional super-set of Class 4 with additional features, but which still conforms to the Class 4 IETM Specifications. Class 1 and 2 are for ETMs which do not have authored-in interaction contained in the information itself. Class 2 ETMs is reserved for automated document viewing systems which employs a viewer which gives the reader some interactive features, but which operate on a document file whose only authored-in interactive information is hypertext references to another spot in the document. Class 1 applies to conventional printed document page images, whereas Class 2 eliminates the pagination restrictions and scrolls through the document without page breaks. Whilst some would like to invent new 'classes' of IETM for marketing purposes, these are the levels defined by CALS and encompass all types of IETM.

== IETM Functionality Matrix ==
Due to the imprecise nature of the generic descriptions used in the class and level description of IETMs, IETMs are now defined using a Functionality Matrix. IETMs can have many different features and the Functionality Matrix is used as a checklist of which features are required for a particular IETM. This checklist more precisely defines what functionality an IETM has, and allows clearer communication between an IETM developer and the IETM customer. Classes and levels of IETMS are no longer regarded as acceptable descriptors of IETMs.

The IETM functionality matrix was first developed by the US Aerospace Industries Association (AIA) Product Support Committee. It is used in most US military technical data specifications as well as S1000D, the international specification for technical publications.

Outline of IETM

- IETM or Interactive electronic Technical Manual, as the name indicates, it is a Manual which is interactive and in the form of electronic/digital.
- Then PDF file is also electronic/digital, will that be called IETM?
- Yes, undoubtedly PDF is also IETM. It's Level 2 IETM.
- I need to give an example so that u can understand better about Levels. . Every one of us must have played digital games. In that, we need to cross various levels. The first level would be simple, the second little difficult, and 3rd level more challenging and 4th Level tough.
- Question is, why this documentation is required?
- Along with phone or vehicle or any household gadgets, we get a user manual because, in case we have any trouble while using, we can refer to the manual and resolve the issue, without connecting to OEM or service center as might not be available 24 X7.
- Hence, these documents should be in simple language and easy to navigate, and easy to reach any point in few clicks.
- The bigger the system/device the more pages are required and more variety of manuals are required. i.e. User manual, Operator manual, Maintainer manual, Spare list, and so on.
- If some fault has occurred in the system, then the operator may need to refer to more than one manual and it is very difficult to refer to multiple hard copies. Even it is not easy to refer to multiple PDFs and refer to the issue as there is no linkage between all PDFs.
- The purpose of the Manual is to guide the operator. If the manual is more dynamic that will be easy for the operator to refer and resolve the issue.
- Level 4 and to some extent Level 3 will be very handy and very fast. All the documents are converted to a database, hence searching and inter-document referring will become easier.
- I.e. a user can search for a problem and easily reach that particular page in seconds and also can see all the related topics to that topic which is being displayed.

Simple is Level 1 and advanced is Level -4
| LEVEL -1 | Normally scanned document | Normal PDF file |
| LEVEL -2 | Basic | PDF file with indexing, internal links between pages |
| LEVEL -3 | Intermediate | HTML/XML based Software |
| LEVEL -4 | Advanced | HTML/XML based software with advanced navigation features |

Indian Defense wants all the equipment to be delivered along with IETMs since 2014. Based on the complexity, Level 3 or Level 4 is asked in the RFQ document. Since 2018, mostly Level 4 is asked to deliver.

=== What is IETM is it a document similar to PDF? ===
1. IETM Level 1 and 2 are PDF files.
2. IETM Levels 3 and 4 are not any document like MS Word or PDF file.
3. IETM is a combination of Software and database. All the manuals are converted to SQL database. Using IETM Viewer, the user can access the data i.e. manuals, drawings, images, etc.
4. IETM has 3 modes. User mode where users can access the documents. Admin mode where Admin can create users and track the activities of users.
5. Super admin or Authoring tool, where all the manuals are converted to database using this authoring tool.

=== Standards ===
IETMs are available in 2 standards

- INDIAN Defense Standard (JSG 0852:2001)
- European Aviation standard (S1000D)

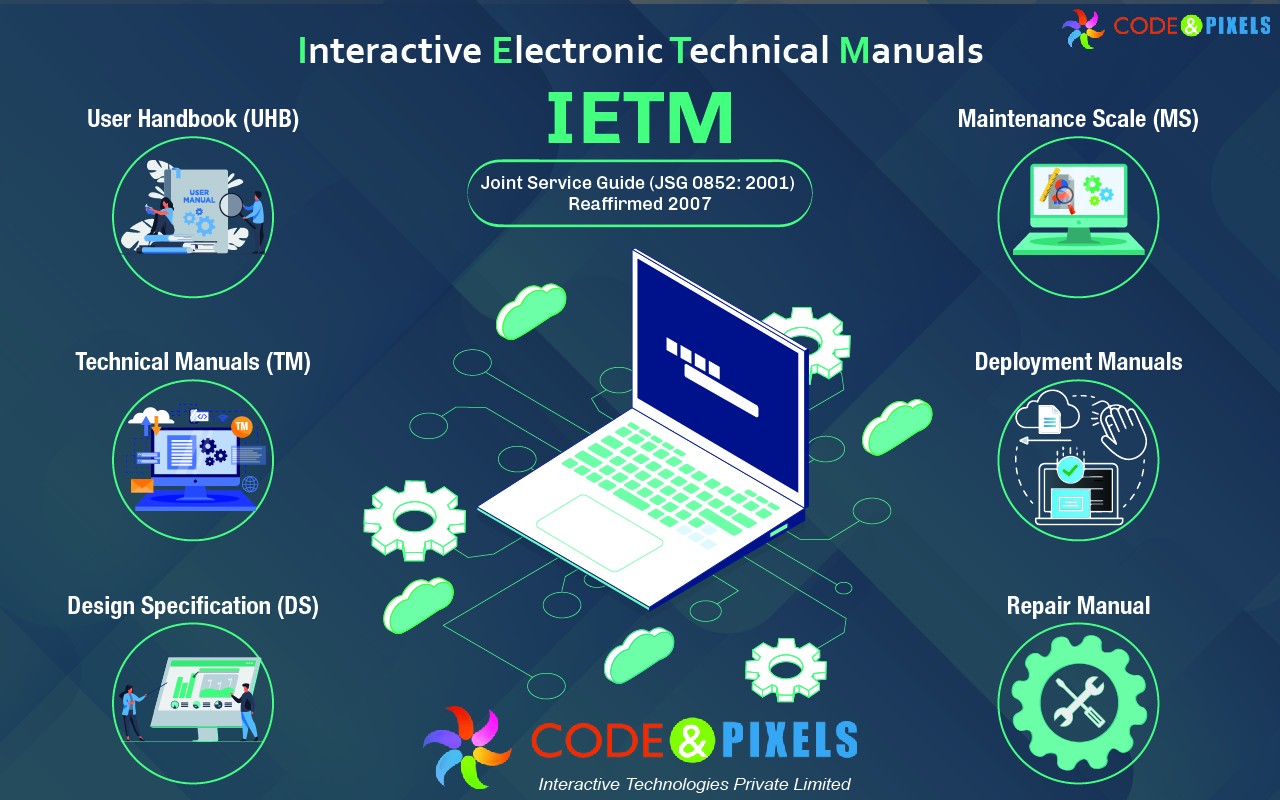
Interactive Electronic Technical Manuals

=== Indian Standard ===
- Government of India, Ministry of defense has framed few standards, Joint service Guide 0852:2001 and reframed in 2007.

=== European Aviation standard ===
- It is called S1000D, mainly used in the Aviation industry
- If the RFQ or tender documents say it is IETM means, it's Indian standard only. If the end-user wants S1000D, then specifically “S1000D IETM LEVEL -4” is mentioned.

== See also ==
- S1000D
- IETD - Interactive Electronic Technical Documentation (German)
