= International Pyrotechnics Society =

- Founded: 1980
- Type: Professional Organization
- Origins: Biennial Pyrotechnic Seminars held since 1968
- Region served: Worldwide
- Method: Conferences, Workshops, Publications
- Members: 275+
- Key people: Dr. Ken. J. Smit (President)
- Website: www.intpyrosoc.org

The International Pyrotechnics Society (IPS) is the professional society for the field of pyrotechnics. The IPS was officially founded in May 1980.

== Introduction ==
Apart from homogeneous Energetic Materials such as High Explosives and Propellants, those materials constituted from separate fuel and oxidizer particles are called pyrolants, or more commonly, Pyrotechnics. The International Pyrotechnics Society (IPS) offers membership to those who work with or have an interest in energetic materials especially pyrotechnics.

== History ==
In the 1960s some of these specialists attended meetings to share experiences, to present their work, their research and to meet new people. These meetings started as "the Colorado meetings", organized by the late Dr. Robert M. Blunt (1916-1995), and this later was formalized into what is currently known as the International Pyrotechnic Seminars.

The International Pyrotechnics Society was officially formed in May 1980. However, The International Pyrotechnics Society can claim that its roots go back to 1968 when the First International Pyrotechnics Seminar was held at Estes Park Colorado, USA. It was the Steering Committee of the Sixth International Pyrotechnics Seminar who officially formed the International Pyrotechnics Society. The Society has continued to sanction International Pyrotechnics Seminars. These have normally been held in the United States every other year and other countries including Australia, China, France, Japan, Netherlands, New Zealand, Russia, Spain, Sweden and United Kingdom during the intervening years. Over the years, the membership of the Society has grown to approximately 275 people in 30 countries.

== Purposes of this Society ==
- To promote and facilitate the exchange of information concerning the science and technology of energetic materials.
- To create and maintain resources that can expedite members’ access to information about the science and technology of energetic materials.
- To encourage research and education in the science and technology of energetic materials.
- To sanction seminars on topics in the areas of energetic materials research, development, technology, and applications at such intervals that are appropriate for furthering the first purpose described above. To promote and facilitate the exchange of information concerning the science and technology of energetic materials, including propellants, explosives, and pyrotechnics, among all interested persons.

=== Seminars and Workshops ===
The IPS sponsors or sanctions seminars on topics in the field of energetic materials research, development, technology and applications on an annual basis. In even years, seminars are held in USA and in the uneven years, the seminars are held outside the USA. Meetings are sometimes jointly organized with similar organizations and institutes such as the French Association of Pyrotechnic. or Fraunhofer Institute for Chemical Technology (ICT).

Since 2004, a number of workshops on the topic of Pyrotechnic Combustion have been held immediately prior to the International Pyrotechnic Seminars. These one day workshops that are organized independently of the main seminar have featured extended presentations by invited specialists on pyrotechnic combustion.

== Promoting Young Scientists ==
The IPS aims to help young scientists to develop their career in this field of work. For each Seminar a bursary can be awarded to assist young pyrotechnicians to attend and present their work at International Seminars sponsored by the Society by contributing to their travel costs. The Bursary is known as the Frank Carver Bursary and is administrated by a Bursary Committee under the auspices of the Society.

== Publication ==
The official publication of the IPS is the Propellants, Explosives, Pyrotechnics journal published bimonthly by Wiley-VCH-publisher in Weinheim/Germany.

== List of officials ==
Elected IPS Presidents since 1980
#	Name	Country	Duration
1	Dr. Robert Matteson Blunt	United States	1980 – 1984
2	Dr. Allen J. Tulis	United States	1984 – 1986
3	Dr. David Dillehay	United States	1986 – 1988
4	Dr. Bernard E. Douda	United States	1988 – 1990
5	Dr. David Anderson	United States	1990 – 1992
6	Jan Hansson	Sweden	1992 – 1994
7	Leo Saulnier	Canada	1994 – 1996
8	Dr. Nigel Davies	United Kingdom	1996 – 1998
9	Alain Fauconnier	France	1998 – 2000
10	Guy Hendrickx	Belgium	2000 – 2002
11	Dr. Tony Cardell	United Kingdom	2002 – 2004
12	Dr. Bill Hubble	United States	2004 – 2006
13	Al Munger	United States	2006 – 2008
14	Rutger Webb	Netherlands	2008 – 2010
15	Dr. Tracy A. Vine	United Kingdom	2010 – 2012
16	Dr. Ernst-Christian Koch	Germany	2012 – 2016
15	Dr. Trevor T. Griffiths	United Kingdom	2016 – 2018
16	Dr. Jesse J. Sabatini	United States	2018 – 2022
17	Dr. Ken J. Smit	Australia	2022 – 2024
