= International Polarisation Scale =

IPS (International Pol Scale) is a price adjustment scale described in the Rules of the Sugar Association of London. It defines incremental price premiums and penalties applied to sugar above 96 degrees polarisation. This scale equates that the sugar contains 96% sucrose'
