= S-Series of ILS specifications =

Set of specifications

The S-Series of ILS specifications is a common denominator for a set of specifications associated to different integrated logistics support aspects. Originally developed by AECMA (French acronym for the Association Européenne des Constructeurs de Matériel Aeronautique, later ASD), the S-Series suite of ILS specifications is managed currently jointly by multinational teams from the AeroSpace and Defence Industries Association of Europe (ASD) and Aerospace Industries Association (AIA) reporting to the AIA/ASD ILS Council. The ILS Council established the term S-Series (of) ILS specifications as the common denominator for all its specifications, and this term was consolidated with the publication of SX000i.

== List of S-Series ILS specifications ==
The specifications encompassing the S-Series of ILS specifications are as follows:

- SX000i - International guide for the use of the S-Series of Integrated Product Support (IPS) specifications
- S1000D - International specification for technical publications using a common source database
- S2000M - International specification for material management
- S3000L - International specification for Logistics Support Analysis (LSA)
- S4000P - International specification for developing and continuously improving preventive maintenance
- S5000F - International specification for in-service data feedback
- S6000T - International specification for training analysis and design
- SX001G - Glossary for the S-Series of IPS specifications
- SX002D - Common data model for the S-Series IPS specifications
- SX003X - Interoperability matrix for the S-Series IPS specifications
- SX004G - Unified Modeling Language (UML) model readers guidance
- SX005G - S-Series ILS specifications XML schema implementation guidance
- S1000X - Input data specification for S1000D
- S2000X - Input data specification for S2000M
- S3000X - Input data specification for S3000L
- S4000X - Input data specification for S4000P
- S6000X - Input data specification for S6000T

== Specification number encoding ==
The encoding of the specifications is inspired by the Dewey Decimal Classification (DDC) of human knowledge. Transversal specifications are encoded with an "X" instead of a number, so as to represent the "10" used in Roman numerals. The initial "S" stands for specification, and the last letter indicates a keyword within the title, as highlighted in the list above. Exceptions to this rule are S1000D (where the "D" stands for documentation) and the specifications ending in "X", which represents "Exchange". Though all letters are upper case, SX000i has a lower case ending letter for improved readability and to prevent confusion with an "l" in certain fonts.

== Other associated specifications ==
Though strictly speaking it is not one of the S-Series specifications, ASD-STE100 is often associated to them because of its common origin with the S-Series of ILS specifications.

== Integration of the specification and with other domains ==
The S-Series of ILS specifications have in the past years made a significant effort to be interoperable, as this was not always necessarily true in the past. In that context, SX000i defines the common ILS process to which all the specifications will adhere, and SX002D defines a common data model that binds the data models of the different specifications together. This integration has ensured that the specifications have been included in the ASD Strategic Standardization Group (SSG) Radar Chart as adopted.

In order to maintain the future interoperability of the specifications, SX000i establishes in its chapter 4 the governance of the S-Series ILS specifications and a common change process. A common unified S-Series ILS Specifications commenting tool was also established.

The S-Series of ILS specifications are also involved in the development of the new ISO 10303-239 (AP239) PLCS Edition 3 project, so as to integrate with the ISO 10303 STEP architecture and non-support domains such as Engineering or Manufacturing. The representatives of the S-Series in the AP239 Edition 3 project are members of the Data Modeling and Exchange Working Group (DMEWG), which is responsible for the development of SX001G, SX002D, SX003X, SX004G and SX005G.

== See also ==
- Specification (technical standard)
