= Common Source Data Base =

A Common Source Database (CSDB) is to provide the user (mainly technical authors, illustrators, and publication managers) with automated processes to handle the complete palette of CSDB objects. Technical documentation is used in many areas of the everyday life. Product liability and many other issues regarding consumer protection have to be covered inside technical documentation. At minimum, a drawing including a few locators has to be provided. Much of this information is in accordance with the international specification for technical documentation S1000D.

== Description ==
A special form of technical documentation is electronic technical documentation, a further subform is interactive electronic technical documentation (IETD). The complexity of IETD especially regarding the huge mass of data elements, their linkage and the version management issuing and release process must be controlled via a special document management system. To handle these complex structures of ASD S1000D IETDs, the Common Source Data Base is necessary.

Starting with the smallest addressable unit, the DataModules under the use of different Document Type Definitions (DTDs) or schemas has to be supported. Furthermore, the publications, in process review forms (IPRFs) in later S1000D versions known as comments, for authoring reasons must be provided. Last but not least the illustrations and all kinds of hotspot declaration files have to be assisted.

Regarding processes to perform the S1000D file-based exchange between customer and/or industry, to generate complete IETDs and to verify all these processes, the CSDB must ensure data integrity and security during all actions listed above.

== Support the handling of technical publication ==
These technical publications consist of DataModules (DMs), Illustrations (ICNs), partly hotspot-declarations and its Info Object instance (IO) or the Publication Module (PM) in later Versions of S1000D. The Info Object instance (XML file, using a special Document Type Definition) consists of DM- and ICN-references to guide the loading process into a retrieval system and to build the table of content, partly the list of applicable publications LOAP.

== Connection between exchanging, authoring/illustrating environment and data vault ==
The basic mechanism is to copy S1000D objects like DMs, IPRFs or Illustrations out of the secured vault of a CSDB into a working area, to avoid that more than one user is able to change the object. After the changes have been performed, the object will be copied back to the CSDB vault and its issue increased.

Furthermore, the CSDB is able to support technical authors or operators with a checking environment. The checks result in standardized files like CSV or plain text, to ensure an easy transfer to the originator of the checked data. The originator may be the technical author during the authoring process or in case of international data exchange in accordance with ASD/AIA S1000D, an industrial partner respective a sub-contractor who delivers documentation.

The checks enclose tests against official documents like:

- business rules of the project
- guidance documents
- style guide documents
- S1000D standard and its versions
- or starting at the version 2.3 of S1000D, against the business rule exchange DataModule (BREX DM).

== Nationalization ==
If the customer is interested in national/translated and customized documentation out of the common documentation, a nationalization process must be supported of the CSDB.

== ASD/AIA S1000D file-based data exchange ==
Data exchange routines and automatisms are the most important reason to develop a CSDB, to ensure a process reliability. The import and export routines can be fully automated or be performed via CSDB operator.

The components of a Data exchange package are for example:
– one data dispatch note (DDN)
– a certain amount of DataModules (DMs) and
– all illustrations, referenced by the DMs above.

The identifier of a DDN is the (DDN-Id) found within the sgml/xml file and expressed in the filename plus related extension.
The identifier of the DM is the data module code (DMC) found within the sgml/xml file and expressed in the filename plus related extension.
The identifier of the Illustration is the illustration control number (ICN) found within the cgm/tif/mil/cg4/etc. file and expressed in the filename plus related extension.

These packages contain all necessary information to provide the receiver with the necessary information.

== Query and search ==
The CSDB must provide or support the complete Integrated Logistics Support (ILS) process with its information. Thus detailed query and search masks have to be delivered.

A good solution may be to use commercial off-the-shelf database products to implement business logic. The CSDB must be able to handle all file formats given by the actual version of S1000D.

== Work Flow Component ==
To implement all kinds of authors and illustrators work including all supporting processes like validation and production of IETD the CSDB used by AIRBUS Defence and Space supports workflow engines and offers standardized interfaces to import and export data.
