= International Parliamentary Scholarship =

Internship program organized annually by the German Bundestag

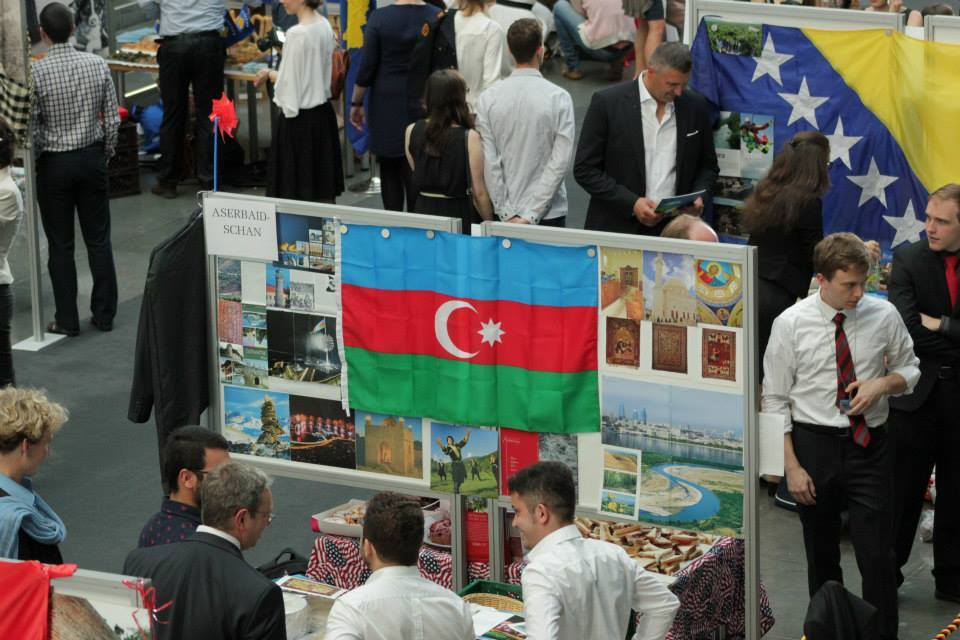
IPS - Stipendiatenabend

The International Parliamentary Scholarship of the German Bundestag (IPS; German: Internationales Parlaments-Stipendium des Deutschen Bundestages) is an internship program organized annually by the German Bundestag. The IPS enables politically engaged young college graduates from outside Germany to get to know the German parliamentary system through a five-month stay in Berlin (1 March through 31 July). The IPS is open to graduates from 42 countries and includes a three-month placement in the offices of members of the German parliament.

== Program description ==
The German Bundestag collaborates with the Free University of Berlin, Humboldt University of Berlin and Technische Universität Berlin to run its IPS program. This gives young people interested in politics from the United States, Canada, France, the Middle East, and other parts of Europe the opportunity to gain first-hand experience of Germany's system of parliamentary government. The scheme involves a three-month placement with a member of the German Bundestag. Participants are introduced to a variety of tasks carried out in a member's office, including drafting speeches, articles and letters, and doing preparatory work for plenary sittings. The Bundestag's exchange programs aim to provide a way to educate young people about the significance of amicable cooperation based on shared political and cultural values. The scholarship recipients are chosen by the Bundestag's independent selection panel.

== History ==
The German Bundestag has organized the International Parliamentary Scholarship since 1986. The program has its origins in the Bundestag Internship Program (BIP), which only accepted young graduates from the United States. 20 of these scholarships were awarded between 1986 and 1988. In 1989 a similar internship program with France was established on a reciprocal basis, allowing German graduates to also experience parliamentary internships in the French Parliament. Since 1989 140 French university graduates have been awarded scholarships of the German Bundestag and 135 German university graduates have received scholarships from the French Parliament.

The IPS, known at the time as the International Parliamentary Program (IPP), was opened up to university graduates from Central and Southeastern Europe after the end of the Cold War. In 1990, Polish and Hungarian applicants were offered the opportunity to participate in the International Parliamentary Scholarship. In the years that followed, the Bundestag has expanded the program to include participants from Bulgaria (1995), the Czech Republic (1993), Estonia (1992), Latvia (1992), Lithuania (1992), Romania (1996), Russia (1993), Serbia (2004), Slovakia (1994), and Ukraine (2000). In 2001, Albania, Bosnia and Herzegovina, Croatia, Macedonia, and Slovenia joined the list of IPS participant countries, followed in 2005 by Georgia and Kazakhstan, and in 2008 by Armenia, Azerbaijan, Moldova and Belarus. University graduates from Kosovo and Macedonia have been able to take part since 2009, which was also the year that Israel was included in the list of participating countries for the first time. Greece, Turkey and Cyprus have been participating in the program since 2015, while Canada will be represented in the program from 2018 onwards.

As of 2017, over 2,500 scholarship recipients have completed the Bundestag's parliamentary internship program.
