= Airlines for America =

Airline trade association

- A4A's official logo
- Formation: 1936; 90 years ago (as Air Transport Association America)
- Headquarters: Washington, D.C., U.S.
- Members: 10 airlines + 1 associate airline (2020)
- Key people: Christopher Sununu, President and CEO; Nicholas Calio, CEO Emeritus
- Website: www.airlines.org

Airlines for America (A4A), formerly known as Air Transport Association of America (ATA), is an American trade association and lobbying group based in Washington, D.C. that has represented major North American airlines since 1936.

The A4A is frequently involved in US government decisions regarding the aviation industry including the creation of the Civil Aeronautics Board, establishment of the air traffic control system and airline deregulation. In its lobbying efforts, A4A publicly promotes air transport as safe and efficient, and it advocates for favorable regulations on taxation, competition, and environmental standards.

Since 1956, the A4A has been responsible for publishing numerical technical classifications and defining specifications for electronic technical data interchange of aircraft systems and sub-systems used in aircraft engineering and aircraft maintenance. These are grouped into 100 Chapters, referred to by civil aviation standards as spec 100, containing the data specifications for maintenance requirements and procedures, aircraft configuration control, and flight operations. In 2000, ATA incorporated earlier specifications into spec 2100 and eventually ATA iSpec 2200 as Information Standards for Aviation Maintenance. In that publication, the ATA described iSpec 2200 as "a global aviation industry standard for the content, structure, and electronic exchange of aircraft engineering, maintenance, and flight operations information".

== Profile ==
=== Mission ===
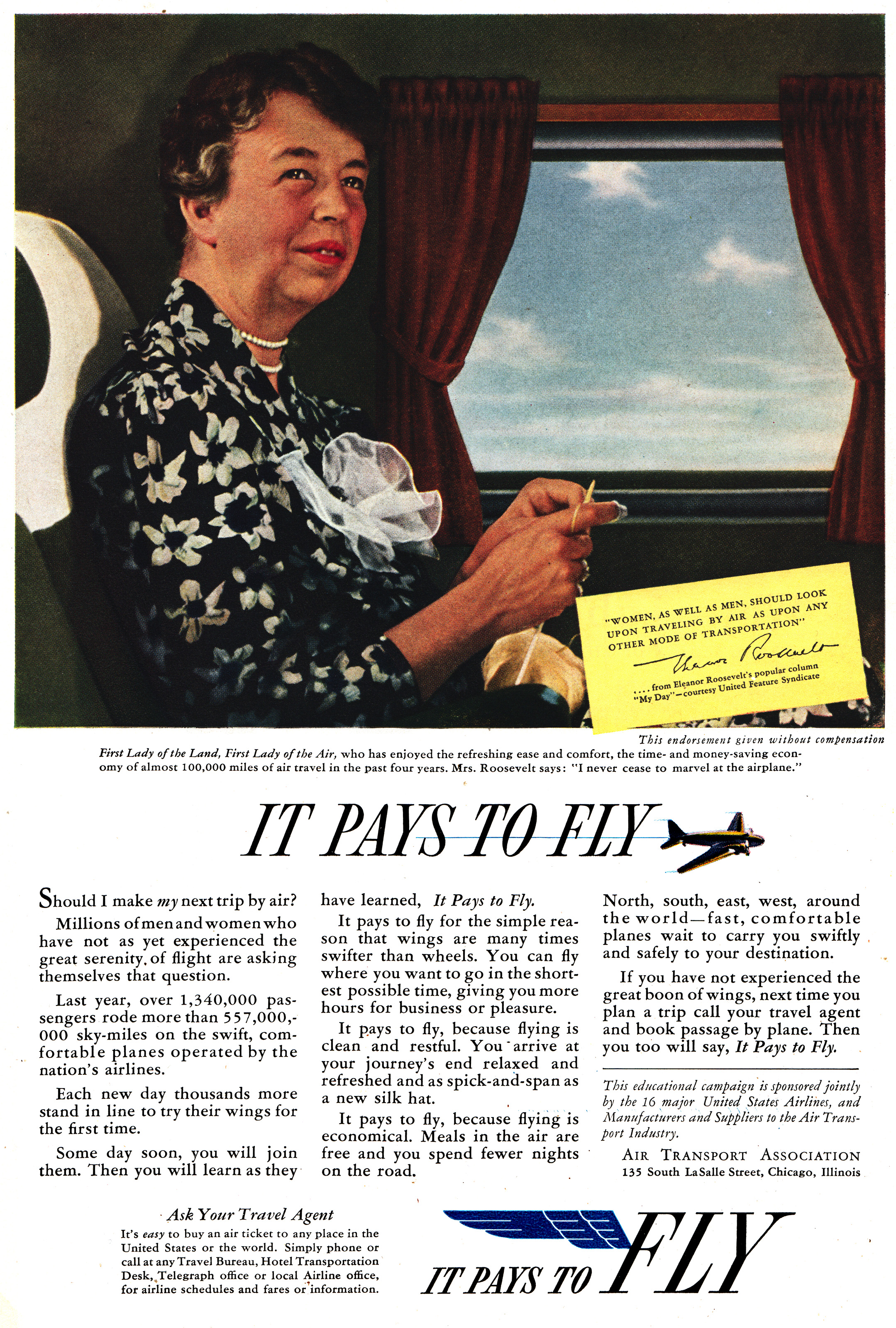
1939 Air Transport Association advertisement with Eleanor Roosevelt promoting commercial air transportation in the US

A4A's stated purpose is to "foster a business and regulatory environment that ensures safe and secure air transportation and enables U.S. airlines to flourish, stimulating economic growth locally, nationally and globally". A4A advocates on behalf of participating regularly scheduled airline corporations to the U.S. Congress, state legislatures, the U.S. Department of Transportation, including the Federal Aviation Administration, and the U.S. Department of Homeland Security, including the Transportation Security Administration and Customs and Border Protection.

Since its founding, A4A has played a major role in all government decisions concerning aviation, including the creation of the Civil Aeronautics Board, the creation of the air traffic control system and airline deregulation. It also advocates that the American government implement a national airline policy that will enable U.S. airlines to function as effective multinational enterprises. Furthermore, it declares that an element of such a policy is the modernization of the U.S. air traffic management system, the Next Generation Air Transportation System (NextGen).

=== Leadership ===
==== Nicholas Calio ====
Nicholas Calio became president of the Air Transport Association (as Airlines for America was then known) in January 2011. Calio was hired after the Republicans made big gains in the 2010 midterm elections. Calio had previously worked in government affairs for Citigroup, and he worked in the administrations of President George H.W. Bush and President George W. Bush.

=== Government relations ===
A4A senior staff members have testified before Congress in favor of lowering taxes on airlines, arguing that current policies reduce profits and growth in the industry. The A4A has also lobbied on topics such as enhancing competition in international markets and advocating for a comprehensive review of the FAA's NextGen program costs, benefits, progress and management. A4A works with its members on legal and technical issues affecting the U.S. airline industry.

A4A operates member committees related to fuel; airports; engineering and maintenance; the environment; training; security; facilitation; ground safety; cargo; passenger services; communications; government affairs; and international affairs. A4A advocates common association member positions before state and local governments to assure governmental and public understanding of the A4A's positions on the aspects of commercial airlines.

=== Legislative and regulatory priorities ===
A4A's priorities include maintaining airline safety; maximizing airline profits; reforming energy-commodity markets; creating an international framework for reducing industry emissions; accelerating modernization of the air traffic control system; and reducing taxes on airlines.

==== National airline policy ====
Airlines for America supports NextGen modernization of the air traffic control system. This system will update the current 1950s radar-based technology with a modern, satellite-based navigation system. Aviation experts predict that a modern air traffic management system will save jet fuel and reduce delays by allowing planes to fly shorter routes and by allowing more aircraft to fly safely at any given time. Modernizing the air traffic control system would also reduce the amount of time that airplanes spend waiting on runways and in holding patterns.

Officially, the A4A has announced five "core elements" of a national airline policy include reducing taxes on the industry, reducing regulation, increased access to foreign markets, making the industry more attractive for investors, and improving the air traffic control system. A4A President and CEO, Nicholas E. Calio, said, "Airlines enable their local businesses to export goods, connect their residents to the world for business and leisure travel – and, importantly, create good-paying jobs. We face the very real risk of U.S. airlines increasingly shifting to feeding foreign airlines at our gateways, rather than expanding their flying of lucrative international routes."

In 2011, Calio said that the value of American exports shipped by air was 117 times the value of exports transported by sea and that commercial aviation had become an important catalyst for the economy. Calio said that the regulatory and tax environment, in addition to inadequate infrastructure, are making it hard for the US airline industry to compete internationally and still turn a profit.

==== Consumer protections ====
On April 25, 2011, the Enhancing Airline Passenger Protections, "76 Federal Regulation 23110" rule was published, with an effective date August 23, 2011. If an airline does not allow a traveler to board an aircraft because it oversold seats, rules enacted in 1978 required airlines to give the traveler compensation of at least $400 or $800, depending on the length of their delay. The new rule increased this minimums to $650 or $1,300. The then-Air Transport Association told the TSA that, although it did not oppose the increase itself, passengers who otherwise might have voluntarily changed their flights might now hold out so they would receive the compensation. Additionally, the new rule enacted a penalty on airlines up to $27,500 per passenger left stranded aboard an aircraft on a tarmac for more than three hours. The ATA and the Regional Airline Association both opposed this new rule. The ATA stated, "As we have noted before, competition in the marketplace and existing Department regulations supported by fair enforcement are sufficient to ensure airlines continue to deliver good customer service."

==== Taxes ====
In 2013, Airlines for America assembled a coalition of labor, business, and consumer advocacy groups in order to oppose increasing the security fee on airline tickets that funds the Transportation Security Administration. A4A called this campaign "Stop Air Tax Now." A4A's efforts were in response to a proposal in late 2013 to increase the security fee to $5.00 from $2.50 per ticket. In 2012, the security fee generated about $2.3 billion in revenue, double the amount for 2002. A4A staffers handed out air-sickness bags and leaflets at Washington Reagan National Airport asking, "Are higher taxes on air travel making you sick?" Nicholas Calio said, "Raising taxes is lose-lose for airlines, passengers, jobs and our overall economy – it’s inappropriate for Congress to use airline passengers as an ATM when it needs more money. Doubling the TSA passenger security tax would cost passengers more than $730 million annually, placing a huge additional tax on the traveling public, with no direct benefit to those who pay it.” Part of the reasoning for the increase was so that air travelers would pay for a greater share of the TSA's annual budget rather than all taxpayers. After a bipartisan deal in Congress, the security fee ended up being changed to $5.60 per flight effective July 21, 2014.

In 2014, Airlines for America supported legislation, the Transparent Airfares Act of 2014 (H.R. 4156; 113th Congress), to advertise ticket prices by their base fare in addition to various government fees and taxes. The legislation would reverse Department of Transportation regulations implemented in 2012 that force airlines to advertise base fares lumped together with taxes and fees. Airlines for America argues that current regulations hide excessive taxes on air travel. Nicholas Calio said, "It's a misnomer to characterize the current law as a consumer protection rule when it really protects the government, not airline passengers, and it's disingenuous for Washington to hide the ball and not be held responsible for the taxes they impose on air travel." A4A said that as of 2014, $61 of a $300 domestic airfare is taxes. The House of Representatives voted in favor of the bill, but the Senate did not vote on it.

==== Fuel efficiency and alternative fuels ====
Airlines for America also has been involved in promoting fuel efficiency and the development of alternative fuels. In April 2014, Nancy Young, A4A's Vice President of Environmental Affairs, testified before the Senate Committee on Agriculture, Nutrition, and Forestry on alternative aviation fuels. Young pointed out that airlines have a natural incentive to be energy efficient and outlined what the airlines are doing to support aviation biofuels. Young encouraged the federal government to further support public-private partnerships such as the Commercial Aviation Alternative Fuels Initiative (CAAFI), the Farm to Fly program.

==== Aircraft emissions ====
A4A opposed efforts by the European Union to unilaterially extend its Emissions Trading Scheme (ETS) to international aviation. The European Union Parliament stayed the extension of the ETS until 2016. The extension of "stop the clock" on ETS was consistent with the agreement reached at the International Civil Aviation Organization Assembly in 2013, which rejected unilateral regulations of carbon emissions while committing the airline industry to achieve carbon neutral growth starting from 2020. The US Congress passed a law authorising the secretary of transportation to prohibit American aircraft operators from complying with the EU ETS.

== Litigation ==
=== Labor relations ===
In 2010 a federal court upheld new democratic voting procedures for workers in the airline and rail industries who want to form unions. Earlier that year, the National Mediation Board (NMB) issued a new rule that says air and rail union elections must be decided by a majority of votes cast. Previously under the Railway Labor Act, which covers rail and airline workers, every worker who did not cast a vote in a representation election was automatically counted as a “No” vote. The Air Transport Association and ten of its member airlines, filed suit in the U.S. District Court for the District of Columbia to block the NMB ruling. The court upheld the new rule and denied ATA's (A4A's) request for an injunction.

=== COVID-19 ===
A4A advocated for ending federal transportation mask mandates during the COVID-19 pandemic.

== A4A Economic Report and Industry Handbook ==
Since 1937 A4A has released an annual economic report on the U.S. airline industry that includes statistics on operational and financial results for passenger and cargo operations. This report includes data on industry revenue, expenses, traffic, fuel use, safety, economic impact and employment. A4A also publishes a handbook on the airline industry that provides background information on airline economics, operations, safety, security and history.

== ATA Spec 100: Manufacturers' Technical Data ==
The then Air Transport Association released the newest version of ATA Spec 100 in 1999. According to the A4A website, this information will not be revised and has been combined with ATA Spec 2100 to produce the ATA iSpec 2200: Information Standards for Aviation Maintenance manual.

This specification defines a widely used numbering scheme for aircraft parts and the appearance of printed aircraft maintenance information. The Federal Aviation Administration's JASC (Joint Aircraft System/Component) code table provides a modified version of ATA Spec 100.

ATA Spec 100 contains format and content guidelines for technical manuals written by aviation manufacturers and suppliers, and is used by airlines and other segments of the industry in the maintenance of their respective products. This document provides the industrywide standard for aircraft systems numbering, often referred to as the ATA system or ATA chapter numbers. The format and content guidelines define the data prepared as conventional printed documentation. In 2000 ATA Spec 100 and ATA Spec 2100 were incorporated into ATA iSpec 2200: Information Standards for Aviation Maintenance. ATA Spec 100 and Spec 2100 will not be updated beyond the 1999 revision level.

== ATA Spec 300: Specification for Packaging of Airline Supplies ==
ATA Spec 300 establishes regulations that ensure effective packaging for supplies and equipment shipped by airlines. It stipulates, for example, that a shipping case be able to withstand a minimum of 100 shipments, have durable recessed handles, be coated with non-corrosive products, and have rounded well constructed edges. There has been an increased use of personal luggage that meets the ATA 300 required standards. The ATA Spec 300 was first published on August 1, 1960.

== Membership ==
=== ATA Airline Members ===
- Alaska Airlines, Inc. (AS)
- American Airlines, Inc. (AA)
- Atlas Air, Inc. (5Y)
- Delta Air Lines, Inc. (DL)
- Federal Express Corporation (FX)
- Hawaiian Airlines (HA)
- JetBlue Airways Corp. (B6)
- Southwest Airlines Co. (WN)
- United Airlines, Inc. (UA)
- UPS Airlines (5X)

On October 27, 2015, Delta Air Lines, Inc. (DL) elected to leave A4A at the end of April 2016, following various disagreements with other members. However, on October 29, 2015, A4A voted to remove Delta Air Lines effective immediately so the Members would speak with one voice. On December 18, 2019, Delta Air Lines, Inc. (DL) and A4A jointly announced that Delta Air Lines would rejoin in 2020.

=== Associate Airline Members ===
- Air Canada (AC)

== See also ==
- Regional Airline Association
- Major airlines of the United States
