= ATA 100 =

Referencing standard for commercial aircraft

ATA 100 contains the reference to the ATA numbering system which is a common referencing standard for commercial aircraft documentation. This commonality permits greater ease of learning and understanding for pilots, aircraft maintenance technicians, and engineers alike. The standard numbering system was published by the Air Transport Association on June 1, 1956. While the ATA 100 numbering system has been superseded, it continued to be widely used until it went out of date in 2015, especially in documentation for general aviation aircraft, on aircraft Fault Messages (for Post Flight Troubleshooting and Repair) and the electronic and printed manuals.

The Joint Aircraft System/Component (JASC) Code Tables was a modified version of the Air Transport Association of America (ATA), Specification 100 code. It was developed by the FAA's, Regulatory Support Division (AFS-600). This code table was constructed by using the new JASC code four digit format, along with an abbreviated code title. The abbreviated titles have been modified in some cases to clarify the intended use of the accompanying code. The final version of the JASC/ATA 100 code was released by the FAA in 2008.

In 2000 the ATA Technical Information and Communications Committee (TICC) developed a new consolidated specification for the commercial aviation industry, ATA iSpec 2200. It includes an industry-wide approach for aircraft system numbering, as well as formatting and data content standards for documentation output. The main objectives of the new specification are to minimize cost and effort expended by operators and manufacturers, improve information quality and timeliness, and facilitate manufacturers' delivery of data that meet airline operational needs. More recently, the international aviation community developed the S1000D standard, an XML specification for preparing, managing, and using equipment maintenance and operations information.

The unique aspect of the chapter numbers is its relevance for all aircraft. Thus a chapter reference number for a Boeing 747 will be the same for other Boeing aircraft, a BAe 125 and Airbus Aircraft. Examples of this include Oxygen (Chapter 35), Electrical Power (Chapter 24) and Doors (Chapter 52). Civil aviation authorities will also organize their information by ATA chapter like the Master Minimum Equipment List (MMEL) Guidebook from Transport Canada.

The ATA chapter format is always CC-SS, where CC is the chapter and SS the section, see ATA extended list section below for details. Some websites, like aircraft parts resellers, will sometimes refer to ATA 72R or 72T for reciprocating and turbine engines (jet or turboprop), this nomenclature is not part per se of the ATA numbering definition. The ATA 72 subchapter are different for reciprocating engines and turbine engines. Under JASC/ATA 100 the reciprocating engine are now under ATA 85.

== ATA Chapters ==
=== Aircraft General ===
ATA Number	ATA Chapter name Line maintenance TAROM RZV
ATA 00	GENERAL
ATA 01	MAINTENANCE POLICY
ATA 02	OPERATIONS
ATA 03	SUPPORT
ATA 04	AIRWORTHINESS LIMITATIONS
ATA 05	TIME LIMITS/MAINTENANCE CHECKS
ATA 06	DIMENSIONS AND AREAS
ATA 07	LIFTING AND SHORING
ATA 08	LEVELING AND WEIGHING
ATA 09	TOWING AND TAXIING
ATA 10	PARKING, MOORING, STORAGE AND RETURN TO SERVICE
ATA 11	PLACARDS AND MARKINGS
ATA 12	SERVICING
ATA 13	HARDWARE AND GENERAL TOOLS
ATA 15	AIRCREW INFORMATION
ATA 16	CHANGE OF ROLE
ATA 18	VIBRATION AND NOISE ANALYSIS (HELICOPTER ONLY)

=== Aircraft systems ===
ATA Number	ATA Chapter name
ATA 20	STANDARD PRACTICES- AIRFRAME
ATA 21	AIR CONDITIONING AND PRESSURIZATION
ATA 22	AUTO FLIGHT
ATA 23	COMMUNICATIONS
ATA 24	ELECTRICAL POWER
ATA 25	EQUIPMENT / FURNISHINGS
ATA 26	FIRE PROTECTION
ATA 27	FLIGHT CONTROLS
ATA 28	FUEL
ATA 29	HYDRAULIC POWER
ATA 30	ICE AND RAIN PROTECTION
ATA 31	INDICATING / RECORDING SYSTEM
ATA 32	LANDING GEAR
ATA 33	LIGHTS
ATA 34	NAVIGATION
ATA 35	OXYGEN
ATA 36	PNEUMATIC
ATA 37	VACUUM
ATA 38	WATER / WASTE
ATA 39	ELECTRICAL - ELECTRONIC PANELS AND MULTIPURPOSE COMPONENTS
ATA 40	MULTISYSTEM
ATA 41	WATER BALLAST
ATA 42	INTEGRATED MODULAR AVIONICS (IMA)
ATA 43	EMERGENCY SOLAR PANEL SYSTEM (ESPS)
ATA 44	CABIN SYSTEMS
ATA 45	CENTRAL MAINTENANCE SYSTEM (CMS)
ATA 46	INFORMATION SYSTEMS
ATA 47	NITROGEN GENERATION SYSTEM
ATA 48	IN FLIGHT FUEL DISPENSING
ATA 49	AIRBORNE AUXILIARY POWER

=== Structure ===
ATA No.	ATA Chapter Name
ATA 50	CARGO AND ACCESSORY COMPARTMENTS
ATA 51	STANDARD PRACTICES AND STRUCTURES - GENERAL
ATA 52	DOORS.
ATA 53	FUSELAGE
ATA 54	NACELLES / PYLONS
ATA 55	STABILIZERS
ATA 56	WINDOWS
ATA 57	WINGS

=== Propeller/rotor ===
ATA Chapter	ATA Chapter name
ATA 60	STANDARD PRACTICES - PROP./ROTOR
ATA 61	PROPELLERS / PROPULSION
ATA 62	MAIN ROTOR(S)
ATA 63	MAIN ROTOR DRIVE(S)
ATA 64	TAIL ROTOR
ATA 65	TAIL ROTOR DRIVE
ATA 66	FOLDING BLADES/PYLON
ATA 67	ROTORS FLIGHT CONTROL

=== Power plant ===
ATA Number	ATA Chapter name
ATA 70	STANDARD PRACTICES - ENGINE
ATA 71	POWER PLANT
ATA 72	ENGINE
ATA 72	ENGINE - TURBINE/TURBOPROP, DUCTED FAN/UNDUCTED FAN Sometimes referred to as ATA 72T
ATA 72	ENGINE - RECIPROCATING Sometimes referred to as ATA72R
ATA 73	ENGINE - FUEL AND CONTROL
ATA 74	IGNITION
ATA 75	BLEED AIR
ATA 76	ENGINE CONTROLS
ATA 77	ENGINE INDICATING
ATA 78	EXHAUST
ATA 79	OIL
ATA 80	STARTING
ATA 81	TURBINES (RECIPROCATING ENGINES)
ATA 82	WATER INJECTION
ATA 83	ACCESSORY GEAR BOX (ENGINE DRIVEN)
ATA 84	PROPULSION AUGMENTATION
ATA 85	RECIPROCATING ENGINE

=== Miscellaneous ===
ATA Number	ATA Chapter name
ATA 91	CHARTS
ATA 97	IMAGE RECORDING
ATA 115	FLIGHT SIMULATOR SYSTEMS/WORK SIMULATION
ATA 116	FLIGHT SIMULATOR CUEING SYSTEM

=== Peculiar Military Chapters ===
ATA Number	ATA Chapter name
ATA 92	ELECTRICAL POWER MULTIPLEXING
ATA 93	SURVEILLANCE
ATA 94	WEAPON SYSTEM
ATA 95	CREW ESCAPE AND SAFETY
ATA 96	MISSILES, DRONES AND TELEMETRY
ATA 98	METEOROLOGICAL AND ATMOSPHERIC RESEARCH
ATA 99	ELECTRONIC WARFARE SYSTEM

== ATA extended list (Out Of Date) ==
=== ATA Specification 2200 ===
The ATA extended List is a breakdown to para (second two numbers e.g. 5-00) and sub para (third two numbers e.g. 5-10-00) for each ATA chapter.

==== ATA Number and Para ====
01 INTRODUCTION

02 ORGANIZATION AND HANDLING OF THE MANUAL

03 GENERAL DESCRIPTION OF THE AIRCRAFT

04 AIRWORTHINESS LIMITATIONS

05 TIME LIMITS/ MAINTENANCE CHECKS

-00 General
-10 Time Limits
-20 Scheduled Maintenance Checks
-30 & -40 Reserved
-50 Unscheduled Maintenance checks

06 DIMENSIONS AND AREAS

07 LIFTING & SHORING

-00 General
-10 Jacking
-20 Shoring

08 LEVELING & WEIGHING

-00 General
-10 Weighing and Balancing
-20 Leveling

09 TOWING & TAXIING

-00 General
-10 Towing
-20 Taxiing

10 PARKING, MOORING, STORAGE & RETURN TO SERVICE

11 PLACARDS AND MARKINGS

-00 General
-10 Exterior Color Schemes and Markings
-20 Exterior Placards and Markings
-30 Interior Placards

12 SERVICING.

-00 General
-10 Replenishing
-20 Scheduled Servicing
-30 Unscheduled Servicing

13 UNSERVICING

-00 General
-10 Methods
-20 Scheduled Unservicing
-30 Unscheduled Unservicing

14 RESERVING

-00 General
-10 Replenishing
-20 Scheduled Reservicing
-30 Unscheduled Reservicing

15 OPERATIONAL CHECK GOOD

-00 General
-10 Standard Practices
-40 Inspection and Observations

16 *Unassigned

17 *Unassigned

18 VIBRATION AND NOISE ANALYSIS (HELICOPTER ONLY)

-00 GENERAL -
-10 VIBRATION ANALYSIS
-20 NOISE ANALYSIS

19 *Unassigned

20 STANDARD PRACTICES-AIRFRAME

-00 Electrical Standard Items/Practices
-90 *Reserved for Airline Use

21 AIR CONDITIONING

-00 Air Conditioning - General
-10 Compression
-20 Distribution
-30 Pressurization Control
-40 Heating
-50 Cooling
-60 Temperature Control
-70 Moisture/Air Contaminant Control

22 AUTO FLIGHT

-00 General
-10 Autopilot
-20 Speed-Attitude Correction
-30 Auto Throttle
-40 System Monitor
-50 Aerodynamic Load Alleviating

23 COMMUNICATIONS

-00 General
-10 Speech Communications
-15 SATCOM
-20 Data Transmission and Automatic Calling
-30 Passenger Address, Entertainment and Comfort
-40 Interphone
-50 Audio Integrating
-60 Static Discharging
-70 Audio & Video Monitoring
-80 Integrated Automatic Tuning

24 ELECTRICAL POWER

-00 General
-10 Generator Drive
-20 AC Generation
-30 DC Generation
-40 External Power
-50 AC Electrical Load Distribution
-60 DC Electrical Load Distribution

25 EQUIPMENT/FURNISHINGS

-00 General
-10 Flight Compartment
-20 Passenger Compartment
-30 Galley
-40 Lavatories
-50 Additional Compartments
-60 Emergency
-70 Available
-80 Insulation

26 FIRE PROTECTION

-00 General
-10 Detection
-20 Extinguishing
-30 Explosion Suppression

27 FLIGHT CONTROLS

-00 General
-10 Aileron & Tab
-20 Rudder & Tab
-30 Elevator & Tab
-40 Horizontal Stabilizer
-50 Flaps
-60 Spoiler, Drag Devices and Variable Aerodynamic Fairings
-70 Gust Lock & Dampener
-80 Lift Augmenting

28 FUEL

-00 General
-10 Storage
-20 Distribution
-30 Dump
-40 Indicating

29 HYDRAULIC POWER

-00 General
-10 Main
-20 Auxiliary
-30 Indicating

30 ICE AND RAIN PROTECTION

-00 General
-10 Airfoil
-20 Air Intakes
-30 Pitot and Static
-40 Windows, Windshields and Doors
-50 Antennas and Radomes
-60 Propellers/Rotors
-70 Water Lines
-80 Detection

31 INDICATING/RECORDING SYSTEMS

-00 General
-10 Instrument & Control Panels
-20 Independent Instruments
-30 Recorders
-40 Central Computers
-50 Central Warning Systems
-60 Central Display Systems
-70 Automatic Data Reporting Systems

32 LANDING GEAR

-00 General
-10 Main Gear and Doors
-20 Nose Gear and Doors
-30 Extension and Retraction
-40 Wheels and Brakes
-50 Steering
-60 Position Indication and Warning
-70 Supplementary Gear

33 LIGHTS

-00 General
-10 Flight Compartment
-20 Passenger Compartment
-30 Cargo and Service Compartments

-40 Exterior
-50 Emergency Lighting

34 NAVIGATION

-00 General
-10 Flight Environment Data
-20 Attitude & Direction
-30 Landing and Taxiing Aids
-40 Independent Position Determining
-50 Dependent Position Determining
-60 Flight Management Computing

35 OXYGEN

-00 General
-10 Crew
-20 Passenger
-30 Portable

36 PNEUMATIC

-00 General
-10 Distribution
-20 Indicating

37 VACUUM

-00 General
-10 Distribution
-20 Indicating

38 WATER/WASTE

-00 General
-10 Potable
-20 Wash
-30 Waste Disposal
-40 Air Supply

39 *Unassigned

40 *Unassigned

41 WATER BALLAST

-00 General
-10 Storage
-20 Dump
-30 Indication

42 Integrated Modular Avionics (IMA)

43 Emergency Solar Panel System (ESPS)

44 CABIN SYSTEMS

-00 General
-10 Cabin Core System
-20 In-flight Entertainment System
-30 External Communication System
-40 Cabin Mass Memory System
-50 Cabin Monitoring System
-60 Miscellaneous Cabin System

45 CENTRAL MAINTENANCE SYSTEM (CMS)

-00 General
-5 thru -19 CMS/Aircraft General
-20 thru -49 CMS/Airframe Systems
-45 Central Maintenance System
-50 thru -59 CMS/Structures
-60 thru -69 CMS/Propellers
-70 thru -89 CMS/Power Plant

46 INFORMATION SYSTEMS

-00 General
-10 Airplane General Information Systems
-20 Flight Deck Information Systems
-30 Maintenance Information Systems
-40 Passenger Cabin Information Systems
-50 Miscellaneous Information Systems

47 NITROGEN GENERATION SYSTEM

48 *Unassigned

49 AIRBORNE AUXILIARY POWER

-00 General
-10 Power Plant
-20 Engine
-30 Engine Fuel and Control
-40 Ignition/Starting
-50 Air
-60 Engine Controls
-70 Indicating
-80 Exhaust
-90 Oil

50 CARGO AND ACCESSORY COMPARTMENTS

-00 General
-10 Cargo Compartments
-20 Cargo Loading Systems
-30 Cargo Related Systems
-40 Aerial delivery
-50 Accessory
-60 Insulation

51 STANDARD PRACTICES, GENERAL

-00 General
-10 Investigation, Cleanup and Aerodynamic Smoothness
-20 Processes
-30 Materials
-40 Fasteners
-50 Support of Airplane for Repair and Alignment Check Procedures
-60 Control-Surface Balancing
-70 Repairs
-80 Electrical Bonding

52 DOORS

-00 General
-10 Passenger/Crew
-20 Emergency Exit
-30 Cargo
-40 Service and Miscellaneous
-50 Fixed Interior
-60 Entrance Stairs
-70 Monitoring and Operation
-80 Landing Gear

53 FUSELAGE

-00 General
-10 thru -90 (As Required) Fuselage Sections

54 NACELLES/PYLONS

-00 General
-10 thru -40 (As Required) Nacelle Section
-50 thru -80 (As Required) Pylon

55 STABILIZERS

-00 General
-10 Horizontal Stabilizer or Canard
-20 Elevator
-30 Vertical Stabilizer
-40 Rudder

56 WINDOWS

-00 General
-10 Flight Compartment
-20 Passenger Compartment
-30 Door
-40 Inspection and Observation

57 WINGS

-00 General
-10 Center Wing
-20 Outer Wing
-30 Wing Tip
-40 Leading Edge and Leading Edge Devices
-50 Trailing Edge Trailing Edge Devices
-60 Ailerons and Elevons
-70 Spoilers
-80 (as required)
-90 Wing Folding System

58 *Unassigned

59 *Reserved for Airline Use

60 STANDARD PRACTICES - PROPELLER/ROTOR

61 PROPELLERS/PROPULSION

-00 General
-10 Propeller Assembly
-20 Controlling
-30 Braking
-40 Indicating
-50 Propulsor Duct

62 ROTOR(S)

-00 General
-10 Rotor blades
-20 Rotor head(s)
-30 Rotor Shaft(s)/Swashplate Assies
-40 Indicating

63 ROTOR DRIVE(S)

-00 General
-10 Engine/Gearbox couplings
-20 Gearboxes
-30 Mounts, attachments
-40 Indicating

64 TAIL ROTOR

-00 General
-10* Rotor blades
-20* Rotor head
-30 Available
-40 Indicating

65 TAIL ROTOR DRIVE

-00 General
-10 Shafts
-20 Gearboxes
-30 Available
-40 Indicating

66 FOLDING BLADES/PYLON

-00 General
-10 Rotor blades
-20 Tail pylon
-30 Controls and Indicating

67 ROTORS FLIGHT CONTROL

-00 General
-10 Rotor
-20 Anti-torque Rotor control (Yaw control)
-30 Servo-control System

70 STANDARD PRACTICES - ENGINES

71 POWER PLANT

-00 General
-10 Cowling
-20 Mounts
-30 Fireseals
-40 Attach Fittings
-50 Electrical Harness
-60 Air Intakes
-70 Engine Drains

72 ENGINE TURBINE/TURBO PROP DUCTED FAN/UNDUCTED FAN

-00 General
-10 Reduction Gear, Shaft Section (Turbo-Prop and/or Front Mounted Gear Driven Propulsor)
-20 Air Inlet Section
-30 Compressor Section
-40 Combustion Section
-50 Turbine Section
-60 Accessory Drives
-70 By-pass Section
-80 Propulsor Section (Rear Mounted)

72 ENGINE - RECIPROCATING

-00 General
-10 Front Section
-20 Power Section
-30 Cylinder Section
-40 Supercharger Section
-50 Lubrication

73 ENGINE FUEL AND CONTROL

-00 General
-10 Distribution
-20 Controlling
-30 Indicating

74 IGNITION

-00 General
-10 Electrical Power
-20 Distribution
-30 Switching

75 AIR

-00 General
-10 Engine Anti-Icing
-20 Cooling
-30 Compressor Control
-40 Indicating

76 ENGINE CONTROLS

-00 General
-10 Power Control
-20 Emergency Shutdown

77 ENGINE INDICATING

-00 General
-10 Power
-20 Temperature
-30 Analyzers
-40 Integrated Engine Instrument Systems

78 EXHAUST

-00 General
-10 Collector/Nozzle
-20 Noise Suppressor
-30 Thrust Reverser
-40 Supplementary Air

79 OIL

-00 General
-10 Storage
-20 Distribution
-30 Indicating

80 STARTING

-00 General
-10 Cranking

81 TURBINES

-00 General
-10 Power Recovery
-20 Turbo-Supercharger

82 WATER INJECTION

-00 General
-10 Storage
-20 Distribution
-30 Dumping and Purging
-40 Indicating

83 ACCESSORY GEAR-BOXES

-00 General
-10 Drive Shaft Section
-20 Gearbox Section

84 PROPULSION AUGMENTATION

-00 General
-10 Jet Assist Takeoff

85 RECIPROCATING ENGINE

-00 General
-10 Fuel Cell Stack

115 FLIGHT SIMULATOR SYSTEMS/WORK SIMULATION

==== Major Zones in Aircraft ====
Zone 100 Fuselage Lower
Zone 200 Fuselage Top
Zone 300 Stabilizers / Empennage
Zone 400 Nacelles-Pylons(RH)
Zone 400 Nacelles-Pylons(LH)
Zone 500 Left Wing
Zone 600 Right Wing
Zone 700 Landing Gear Compartment
Zone 800 Doors
Zone 900 Lavatories & Galleys

==== Major sub Zones in Aircraft ====
Zone 100 Fuselage Lower

111:Lower Nose Compartment (BS 178 - BS 360)
112:Electronic Compartment (BS 360 - BS 480)
113:Forward Cargo Compartment 727-100 (BS 480 - BS 680) 727-200(BS 480 - BS 720D)
114:Air Conditioning Distribution Bay 727-100(BS 680 - BS 740) 727-200(BS 680 - BS 720D - BS 740)
115:Aft Cargo Compartment (BS 952 - BS 1176)
116:Forward Stairs and Fairing Door (BS 303.9 - BS 351.2, If Applicable)
131:Nose Wheel Well (BS 227.8 - BS 351.2)
132:Keel Beam Area (Antenna Bays) (BS 740 - BS 960)
133:Left Air Conditioning Equipment Compartment 727-100(BS 580 - BS 870)  727-200(BS 698 - BS 870)
134:Right Air Conditioning Equipment Compartment 727-100(BS 580 - BS 870)  727-200(BS 698 - BS 870)
135:Left Main Wheel Well And Wing To Body Fairing 727-100 (BS 870 - BS 1076) 727-200(BS 870 - BS 1007)
136:Right Main Wheel Well And Wing To Body Fairing 727-100 (BS 870 - BS 1076) 727-200(BS 870 - BS 1007)
141:Radome (BS 130 - BS 178)
174:Bladder Fuel Cell Area Tank 2 (Left BBL 70.5 - Right BBL 70.5)

Zone 200 Fuselage Top

221:Control Cabin Left (BS 178 - BS 259.5)
222:Control Cabin Right (BS 178 - BS 259.5)
223:Third Crewmember Station (BS 259.5 - BS 302)
224:Passenger Cabin (BS 302 - BS 1183)
225:Forward Lavatory Compartment (BS 304 - BS 343)
226:Galley Units No1 & No2 (BS 600 - BS 708)
227:Aft Left Lavatory Compartment (BS 1137 - BS 1176)
228:Aft Right Lavatory Compartment (BS 1137 - BS 1176)
237:Aft Airstairs Left Equipment Area (BS 1183 - BS 1342.4)
238:Aft Airstairs Right Equipment Area (BS 1183 - BS 1342.4)
239:Tailskid Compartment
242:Forward Entry Door (BS 312)
246:Aft Entry Door (BS 1183)
246A:Aft Service Door (BS 1052)
247:Aft Airstairs (BS 1223)
248:Main Cargo Door (BS 480 - BS 620 If Applicable)
249:Escape Hatches (BS 772 - BS 873)

Zone 300 Stabilizers / Empennage

391:Left Horizontal Stabilizer (Inspar)
391A:Left Horizontal Stabilizer (Leading Edge)
391B:Left Horizontal Stabilizer (Trailing Edge)
392:Right Horizontal Stabilizer (Inspar)
392A:Right Horizontal Stabilizer (Leading Edge)
392B:Right Horizontal Stabiliser (Trailing Edge)
393:Left Elevator And Tab
394:Right Elevator And Tab
395:Vertical Fin (Inspar)
395A:Vertical Fin (Leading Edge)
395B:Vertical Fin (Trailing Edge)
396:Stabilizer Trim Mechanism Compartment
397:Vertical Fin Tip Fairing
398:Upper Rudder And Tab
399:Lower Rudder And Tab

Zone 400 Nacelles-Pylons

451:Engine No1
452:Engine No2
453:Engine No3
454:Engine Strut No1
455:Engine Strut No3

Zone 500 Left Wing

561:Left Removable Wing Tip
562:Left Outboard Wing Leading Edge (Inc Slats 1 -4 WS 332.5 - WS 790)
563:Left Inbd Wing Leading Edge (Inc L.D Flaps 1 -3 WBL 70.597 - WS 332.5)
571:Left Fuel Vent Surge Tank And Fuel Vent Outlet (Left WS 716.5 - Removable Wing Tip)
572:Tank No 1 ( Left WS 224.5 - Left WS 715.5)
573:Left Integral Section Tank No 2 (Left WBL 70.597 - WS 2244.5)
581:Left Wing Trailing Edge, Outbd Aileron And Control Tab
582:Left Wing Trailing Edge Outbd Flap And Spoilers No1 - No4
583:Left Wing Trailing Edge, Inbd Aileron And Control Tab
584:Left Wing Trailing Edge, Inbd Flap And Spoilers No5 - No7

Zone 600 Right Wing

664:Right Inbd Wing Leading Edge (Inc L.D Edge Flaps No44 - No6 WBL 70.597 - WS 332.5)
665:Right Otbd Wing Leading Edge (Inc Slats No5 - No8 WS 322.5 - WS 790)
666:Right Removable Wing Tip
675:Right Integral Section Tank No2 (Right WBL 70.597 - Right WS 224.5)
676:Tank No3 (Right WS 224.5 - Right WS 716.5)
677:Right Fuel Vent Surge Tank And Fuel Outlet (Right WS 716.5 - Removable Wing Tip)
685:Right Wing Trailing Edge, Inbd Flap And Spoilers No8 - No10
686:Right Wing Trailing Edge, Inbd Aileron And Control Tab
687:Right Wing Trailing Edge, Otbd Flap And Spoilers No11 - No14
688:Right Wing Trailing Edge, Otbd Aileron And Control Tab

Zone 700 Landing Gear Compartment

710:Nose gear and doors
711:Nose gear
712:Forward side door R.H.
713:Forward side door L.H.
714:Rear door R.H.
715:Rear door L.H.
720:Main gear and doors L.H.
721:Main gear
722:Forward door
723:Mid door
724:Rear door R.H.
725:Rear door L.H.
730:Main gear and doors R.H.
731:Main gear
732:Forward door
733:Mid door
734:Rear door R.H.
735:Rear door L.H.

Zone 800 Doors

821:Forward Cargo Door
822:Aft Cargo Door
831:Forward Entry Door
832:Emergency Exit
833:Emergency Exit
834:Aft Entry Door
841:Forward Galley Service Door
842:Emergency Exit
843:Emergency Exit
844:Aft Galley Service Door

== See also ==
- Air Transport Association
- S1000D
