= Aerospace, Security and Defence Industries Association of Europe =

Trade association for the aerospace, defence and security industries in Europe

- Abbreviation: ASD
- Formation: 2004
- Merger of: Association of European Space Industry (EUROSPACE), European Association of Aerospace Industries (AECMA) and European Defence Industries Group (EDIG)
- Type: Trade association
- Headquarters: Rue du Trône 100, 1050 Brussels
- Fields: Aerospace, defence and security
- Members: 4,000 companies
- Key people: Micael Johansson (President); Camille Grand (Secretary General)
- Website: www.asd-europe.org

The Aerospace, Security and Defence Industries Association of Europe (ASD) is a trade association for the aerospace, defence and security industries in Europe. According to the organisation, it represents over 4,000 companies in 22 countries.

== History ==
The organisation was formed in 2004 through the merger of the Association of European Space Industry (Eurospace), European Association of Aerospace Industries (AECMA) and European Defence Industries Group (EDIG).

== Activities ==
The organisation serves as a lobbying group and policy advocate for the industry within the European Union establishment, in particular the European Defence Agency, the European Union Aviation Safety Agency, as well as the European Union Agency for the Space Programme. It convinced the European Commission to consider most of the activities of the defence industry as sustainable according to the environmental, social, and governance criteria in the 2019 Sustainable Finance Disclosure Regulation.

The organisation is responsible for maintaining the ASD-STE100 Simplified Technical English (STE) standards for aerospace technical documentation.
